

458001–458100 

|-bgcolor=#d6d6d6
| 458001 ||  || — || November 18, 2009 || Kitt Peak || Spacewatch || — || align=right | 1.7 km || 
|-id=002 bgcolor=#d6d6d6
| 458002 ||  || — || October 25, 2009 || Kitt Peak || Spacewatch || EOS || align=right | 1.7 km || 
|-id=003 bgcolor=#d6d6d6
| 458003 ||  || — || November 19, 2009 || Kitt Peak || Spacewatch || — || align=right | 2.7 km || 
|-id=004 bgcolor=#d6d6d6
| 458004 ||  || — || November 19, 2009 || Kitt Peak || Spacewatch || — || align=right | 2.8 km || 
|-id=005 bgcolor=#E9E9E9
| 458005 ||  || — || November 11, 2009 || Kitt Peak || Spacewatch || — || align=right | 2.3 km || 
|-id=006 bgcolor=#d6d6d6
| 458006 ||  || — || November 19, 2009 || Kitt Peak || Spacewatch || — || align=right | 3.1 km || 
|-id=007 bgcolor=#d6d6d6
| 458007 ||  || — || November 19, 2009 || Kitt Peak || Spacewatch || KOR || align=right | 1.4 km || 
|-id=008 bgcolor=#d6d6d6
| 458008 ||  || — || November 19, 2009 || Kitt Peak || Spacewatch || — || align=right | 3.8 km || 
|-id=009 bgcolor=#d6d6d6
| 458009 ||  || — || November 19, 2009 || Mount Lemmon || Mount Lemmon Survey || — || align=right | 3.5 km || 
|-id=010 bgcolor=#d6d6d6
| 458010 ||  || — || November 19, 2009 || Kitt Peak || Spacewatch || — || align=right | 3.2 km || 
|-id=011 bgcolor=#d6d6d6
| 458011 ||  || — || October 24, 2009 || Kitt Peak || Spacewatch || — || align=right | 2.5 km || 
|-id=012 bgcolor=#FA8072
| 458012 ||  || — || November 22, 2009 || Mount Lemmon || Mount Lemmon Survey || — || align=right data-sort-value="0.74" | 740 m || 
|-id=013 bgcolor=#d6d6d6
| 458013 ||  || — || October 22, 2009 || Mount Lemmon || Mount Lemmon Survey || — || align=right | 2.0 km || 
|-id=014 bgcolor=#d6d6d6
| 458014 ||  || — || November 20, 2009 || Kitt Peak || Spacewatch || VER || align=right | 2.5 km || 
|-id=015 bgcolor=#d6d6d6
| 458015 ||  || — || November 20, 2009 || Kitt Peak || Spacewatch || HYG || align=right | 3.2 km || 
|-id=016 bgcolor=#d6d6d6
| 458016 ||  || — || February 27, 2006 || Kitt Peak || Spacewatch || — || align=right | 2.9 km || 
|-id=017 bgcolor=#d6d6d6
| 458017 ||  || — || October 14, 2009 || Mount Lemmon || Mount Lemmon Survey || EOS || align=right | 3.0 km || 
|-id=018 bgcolor=#d6d6d6
| 458018 ||  || — || September 21, 2009 || Mount Lemmon || Mount Lemmon Survey || — || align=right | 3.8 km || 
|-id=019 bgcolor=#d6d6d6
| 458019 ||  || — || September 22, 2009 || Mount Lemmon || Mount Lemmon Survey || — || align=right | 2.8 km || 
|-id=020 bgcolor=#fefefe
| 458020 ||  || — || November 19, 2009 || Catalina || CSS || H || align=right data-sort-value="0.85" | 850 m || 
|-id=021 bgcolor=#d6d6d6
| 458021 ||  || — || November 19, 2009 || Mount Lemmon || Mount Lemmon Survey || VER || align=right | 3.7 km || 
|-id=022 bgcolor=#d6d6d6
| 458022 ||  || — || November 19, 2009 || Mount Lemmon || Mount Lemmon Survey || — || align=right | 2.8 km || 
|-id=023 bgcolor=#d6d6d6
| 458023 ||  || — || October 27, 2009 || Mount Lemmon || Mount Lemmon Survey || EOS || align=right | 1.6 km || 
|-id=024 bgcolor=#d6d6d6
| 458024 ||  || — || November 21, 2009 || Kitt Peak || Spacewatch || — || align=right | 2.7 km || 
|-id=025 bgcolor=#d6d6d6
| 458025 ||  || — || November 23, 2009 || Kitt Peak || Spacewatch || — || align=right | 5.5 km || 
|-id=026 bgcolor=#d6d6d6
| 458026 ||  || — || October 18, 1998 || Kitt Peak || Spacewatch || — || align=right | 2.6 km || 
|-id=027 bgcolor=#E9E9E9
| 458027 ||  || — || November 23, 2009 || Kitt Peak || Spacewatch || AGN || align=right | 1.1 km || 
|-id=028 bgcolor=#d6d6d6
| 458028 ||  || — || November 23, 2009 || Kitt Peak || Spacewatch || EOS || align=right | 1.8 km || 
|-id=029 bgcolor=#d6d6d6
| 458029 ||  || — || November 11, 2009 || Kitt Peak || Spacewatch || — || align=right | 3.7 km || 
|-id=030 bgcolor=#d6d6d6
| 458030 ||  || — || October 1, 2003 || Kitt Peak || Spacewatch || EOS || align=right | 2.0 km || 
|-id=031 bgcolor=#d6d6d6
| 458031 ||  || — || November 24, 2009 || Kitt Peak || Spacewatch || — || align=right | 2.2 km || 
|-id=032 bgcolor=#d6d6d6
| 458032 ||  || — || November 25, 2009 || Mount Lemmon || Mount Lemmon Survey || — || align=right | 2.9 km || 
|-id=033 bgcolor=#d6d6d6
| 458033 ||  || — || January 7, 1999 || Kitt Peak || Spacewatch || — || align=right | 2.5 km || 
|-id=034 bgcolor=#d6d6d6
| 458034 ||  || — || September 20, 2009 || Mount Lemmon || Mount Lemmon Survey || EOS || align=right | 2.0 km || 
|-id=035 bgcolor=#d6d6d6
| 458035 ||  || — || November 17, 2009 || Kitt Peak || Spacewatch || — || align=right | 2.3 km || 
|-id=036 bgcolor=#d6d6d6
| 458036 ||  || — || November 18, 2009 || Kitt Peak || Spacewatch || — || align=right | 2.7 km || 
|-id=037 bgcolor=#d6d6d6
| 458037 ||  || — || November 18, 2009 || Kitt Peak || Spacewatch || — || align=right | 3.7 km || 
|-id=038 bgcolor=#d6d6d6
| 458038 ||  || — || November 18, 2009 || Kitt Peak || Spacewatch || EOS || align=right | 1.9 km || 
|-id=039 bgcolor=#E9E9E9
| 458039 ||  || — || November 20, 2009 || Kitt Peak || Spacewatch || — || align=right | 2.3 km || 
|-id=040 bgcolor=#d6d6d6
| 458040 ||  || — || September 19, 2009 || Mount Lemmon || Mount Lemmon Survey || EOS || align=right | 1.5 km || 
|-id=041 bgcolor=#d6d6d6
| 458041 ||  || — || November 16, 2009 || Mount Lemmon || Mount Lemmon Survey || — || align=right | 2.2 km || 
|-id=042 bgcolor=#d6d6d6
| 458042 ||  || — || November 16, 2009 || Mount Lemmon || Mount Lemmon Survey || EOS || align=right | 1.9 km || 
|-id=043 bgcolor=#d6d6d6
| 458043 ||  || — || October 24, 2009 || Kitt Peak || Spacewatch || KOR || align=right | 1.2 km || 
|-id=044 bgcolor=#d6d6d6
| 458044 ||  || — || October 23, 2009 || Mount Lemmon || Mount Lemmon Survey || — || align=right | 2.6 km || 
|-id=045 bgcolor=#d6d6d6
| 458045 ||  || — || October 26, 2009 || Kitt Peak || Spacewatch || — || align=right | 2.9 km || 
|-id=046 bgcolor=#d6d6d6
| 458046 ||  || — || November 18, 2009 || Mount Lemmon || Mount Lemmon Survey || NAE || align=right | 1.9 km || 
|-id=047 bgcolor=#d6d6d6
| 458047 ||  || — || October 22, 2009 || Mount Lemmon || Mount Lemmon Survey || — || align=right | 2.9 km || 
|-id=048 bgcolor=#d6d6d6
| 458048 ||  || — || September 28, 2003 || Kitt Peak || Spacewatch || critical || align=right | 1.8 km || 
|-id=049 bgcolor=#d6d6d6
| 458049 ||  || — || November 16, 2009 || Kitt Peak || Spacewatch || — || align=right | 2.6 km || 
|-id=050 bgcolor=#d6d6d6
| 458050 ||  || — || November 11, 2009 || Kitt Peak || Spacewatch || — || align=right | 2.5 km || 
|-id=051 bgcolor=#d6d6d6
| 458051 ||  || — || November 17, 2009 || Kitt Peak || Spacewatch || — || align=right | 3.2 km || 
|-id=052 bgcolor=#d6d6d6
| 458052 ||  || — || November 24, 2009 || Kitt Peak || Spacewatch || — || align=right | 3.3 km || 
|-id=053 bgcolor=#d6d6d6
| 458053 ||  || — || November 17, 2009 || Kitt Peak || Spacewatch || Tj (2.99) || align=right | 4.6 km || 
|-id=054 bgcolor=#d6d6d6
| 458054 ||  || — || November 17, 2009 || Kitt Peak || Spacewatch || VER || align=right | 2.5 km || 
|-id=055 bgcolor=#d6d6d6
| 458055 ||  || — || November 25, 2009 || Kitt Peak || Spacewatch || THM || align=right | 1.8 km || 
|-id=056 bgcolor=#d6d6d6
| 458056 ||  || — || November 16, 2009 || Mount Lemmon || Mount Lemmon Survey || — || align=right | 3.7 km || 
|-id=057 bgcolor=#d6d6d6
| 458057 ||  || — || November 26, 2009 || Mount Lemmon || Mount Lemmon Survey || — || align=right | 2.7 km || 
|-id=058 bgcolor=#d6d6d6
| 458058 ||  || — || November 22, 2009 || Kitt Peak || Spacewatch || — || align=right | 3.1 km || 
|-id=059 bgcolor=#d6d6d6
| 458059 ||  || — || November 11, 2009 || Mount Lemmon || Mount Lemmon Survey || EOS || align=right | 1.8 km || 
|-id=060 bgcolor=#d6d6d6
| 458060 ||  || — || December 15, 2009 || Mount Lemmon || Mount Lemmon Survey || — || align=right | 3.2 km || 
|-id=061 bgcolor=#d6d6d6
| 458061 ||  || — || November 11, 2009 || Socorro || LINEAR || — || align=right | 3.0 km || 
|-id=062 bgcolor=#FFC2E0
| 458062 ||  || — || December 18, 2009 || Mount Lemmon || Mount Lemmon Survey || APO || align=right data-sort-value="0.60" | 600 m || 
|-id=063 bgcolor=#d6d6d6
| 458063 Gustavomuler ||  ||  || December 21, 2009 || Tzec Maun || E. Schwab || — || align=right | 3.6 km || 
|-id=064 bgcolor=#d6d6d6
| 458064 ||  || — || December 16, 2009 || Mount Lemmon || Mount Lemmon Survey || LIX || align=right | 3.4 km || 
|-id=065 bgcolor=#d6d6d6
| 458065 ||  || — || December 18, 2009 || Mount Lemmon || Mount Lemmon Survey || — || align=right | 2.9 km || 
|-id=066 bgcolor=#d6d6d6
| 458066 ||  || — || December 19, 2009 || Kitt Peak || Spacewatch || — || align=right | 3.5 km || 
|-id=067 bgcolor=#d6d6d6
| 458067 ||  || — || September 22, 2009 || Mount Lemmon || Mount Lemmon Survey || — || align=right | 2.9 km || 
|-id=068 bgcolor=#d6d6d6
| 458068 ||  || — || March 13, 2005 || Mount Lemmon || Mount Lemmon Survey || EOS || align=right | 1.7 km || 
|-id=069 bgcolor=#d6d6d6
| 458069 ||  || — || December 19, 2009 || Mount Lemmon || Mount Lemmon Survey || EOS || align=right | 2.3 km || 
|-id=070 bgcolor=#d6d6d6
| 458070 ||  || — || December 20, 2004 || Mount Lemmon || Mount Lemmon Survey || — || align=right | 4.0 km || 
|-id=071 bgcolor=#d6d6d6
| 458071 ||  || — || November 27, 2009 || Mount Lemmon || Mount Lemmon Survey || — || align=right | 3.7 km || 
|-id=072 bgcolor=#d6d6d6
| 458072 ||  || — || November 22, 2009 || Kitt Peak || Spacewatch || — || align=right | 3.5 km || 
|-id=073 bgcolor=#d6d6d6
| 458073 ||  || — || December 18, 2009 || Mount Lemmon || Mount Lemmon Survey || — || align=right | 3.0 km || 
|-id=074 bgcolor=#d6d6d6
| 458074 ||  || — || December 20, 2009 || Mount Lemmon || Mount Lemmon Survey || — || align=right | 3.2 km || 
|-id=075 bgcolor=#d6d6d6
| 458075 ||  || — || March 10, 2005 || Mount Lemmon || Mount Lemmon Survey || THM || align=right | 2.1 km || 
|-id=076 bgcolor=#d6d6d6
| 458076 ||  || — || September 28, 2009 || Mount Lemmon || Mount Lemmon Survey || — || align=right | 3.8 km || 
|-id=077 bgcolor=#d6d6d6
| 458077 ||  || — || January 6, 2010 || Kitt Peak || Spacewatch || — || align=right | 2.7 km || 
|-id=078 bgcolor=#d6d6d6
| 458078 ||  || — || November 22, 2003 || Catalina || CSS || — || align=right | 2.4 km || 
|-id=079 bgcolor=#d6d6d6
| 458079 ||  || — || December 20, 2009 || Mount Lemmon || Mount Lemmon Survey || — || align=right | 3.4 km || 
|-id=080 bgcolor=#d6d6d6
| 458080 ||  || — || November 16, 2009 || Mount Lemmon || Mount Lemmon Survey || — || align=right | 3.5 km || 
|-id=081 bgcolor=#d6d6d6
| 458081 ||  || — || January 8, 2010 || Kitt Peak || Spacewatch || — || align=right | 3.5 km || 
|-id=082 bgcolor=#d6d6d6
| 458082 ||  || — || January 8, 2010 || Kitt Peak || Spacewatch || ELF || align=right | 4.7 km || 
|-id=083 bgcolor=#d6d6d6
| 458083 ||  || — || January 8, 2010 || Mount Lemmon || Mount Lemmon Survey || — || align=right | 4.6 km || 
|-id=084 bgcolor=#d6d6d6
| 458084 ||  || — || November 20, 2009 || Mount Lemmon || Mount Lemmon Survey || — || align=right | 2.6 km || 
|-id=085 bgcolor=#d6d6d6
| 458085 ||  || — || January 10, 2010 || Socorro || LINEAR || THB || align=right | 3.3 km || 
|-id=086 bgcolor=#d6d6d6
| 458086 ||  || — || January 8, 2010 || Kitt Peak || Spacewatch || — || align=right | 3.7 km || 
|-id=087 bgcolor=#d6d6d6
| 458087 ||  || — || January 8, 2010 || Catalina || CSS || — || align=right | 1.8 km || 
|-id=088 bgcolor=#d6d6d6
| 458088 ||  || — || January 11, 2010 || Kitt Peak || Spacewatch || — || align=right | 2.9 km || 
|-id=089 bgcolor=#d6d6d6
| 458089 ||  || — || January 13, 2010 || Mount Lemmon || Mount Lemmon Survey || — || align=right | 3.4 km || 
|-id=090 bgcolor=#d6d6d6
| 458090 ||  || — || December 20, 2009 || Kitt Peak || Spacewatch || Tj (2.99) || align=right | 4.3 km || 
|-id=091 bgcolor=#d6d6d6
| 458091 ||  || — || December 15, 2009 || Catalina || CSS || — || align=right | 4.8 km || 
|-id=092 bgcolor=#d6d6d6
| 458092 ||  || — || January 6, 2010 || Catalina || CSS || — || align=right | 4.0 km || 
|-id=093 bgcolor=#d6d6d6
| 458093 ||  || — || January 8, 2010 || WISE || WISE || 3:2 || align=right | 5.7 km || 
|-id=094 bgcolor=#d6d6d6
| 458094 ||  || — || January 9, 2010 || WISE || WISE || — || align=right | 4.2 km || 
|-id=095 bgcolor=#E9E9E9
| 458095 ||  || — || September 29, 2009 || Mount Lemmon || Mount Lemmon Survey || — || align=right | 1.7 km || 
|-id=096 bgcolor=#d6d6d6
| 458096 ||  || — || December 15, 1999 || Kitt Peak || Spacewatch || — || align=right | 3.6 km || 
|-id=097 bgcolor=#d6d6d6
| 458097 ||  || — || January 20, 2010 || WISE || WISE || — || align=right | 2.9 km || 
|-id=098 bgcolor=#d6d6d6
| 458098 ||  || — || October 23, 2009 || Mount Lemmon || Mount Lemmon Survey || — || align=right | 3.2 km || 
|-id=099 bgcolor=#d6d6d6
| 458099 ||  || — || June 30, 2008 || Kitt Peak || Spacewatch || — || align=right | 4.4 km || 
|-id=100 bgcolor=#d6d6d6
| 458100 ||  || — || October 21, 2009 || Mount Lemmon || Mount Lemmon Survey || — || align=right | 3.6 km || 
|}

458101–458200 

|-bgcolor=#d6d6d6
| 458101 ||  || — || January 6, 2005 || Catalina || CSS || — || align=right | 3.2 km || 
|-id=102 bgcolor=#d6d6d6
| 458102 ||  || — || January 6, 2010 || Kitt Peak || Spacewatch || URS || align=right | 5.9 km || 
|-id=103 bgcolor=#d6d6d6
| 458103 ||  || — || February 9, 2010 || Mount Lemmon || Mount Lemmon Survey || — || align=right | 2.9 km || 
|-id=104 bgcolor=#d6d6d6
| 458104 ||  || — || November 21, 2009 || Mount Lemmon || Mount Lemmon Survey || — || align=right | 3.0 km || 
|-id=105 bgcolor=#d6d6d6
| 458105 ||  || — || February 13, 2010 || Mount Lemmon || Mount Lemmon Survey || — || align=right | 2.5 km || 
|-id=106 bgcolor=#d6d6d6
| 458106 ||  || — || February 5, 2010 || Kitt Peak || Spacewatch || — || align=right | 3.1 km || 
|-id=107 bgcolor=#d6d6d6
| 458107 ||  || — || October 27, 2009 || Kitt Peak || Spacewatch || — || align=right | 5.1 km || 
|-id=108 bgcolor=#d6d6d6
| 458108 ||  || — || February 12, 2010 || Socorro || LINEAR || Tj (2.97) || align=right | 3.9 km || 
|-id=109 bgcolor=#E9E9E9
| 458109 ||  || — || February 21, 2006 || Catalina || CSS || — || align=right | 2.3 km || 
|-id=110 bgcolor=#d6d6d6
| 458110 ||  || — || September 29, 2008 || Mount Lemmon || Mount Lemmon Survey || — || align=right | 2.5 km || 
|-id=111 bgcolor=#d6d6d6
| 458111 ||  || — || January 8, 2010 || Mount Lemmon || Mount Lemmon Survey || — || align=right | 4.4 km || 
|-id=112 bgcolor=#d6d6d6
| 458112 ||  || — || April 2, 2005 || Mount Lemmon || Mount Lemmon Survey || — || align=right | 2.7 km || 
|-id=113 bgcolor=#d6d6d6
| 458113 ||  || — || February 15, 2010 || Mount Lemmon || Mount Lemmon Survey || 7:4 || align=right | 5.6 km || 
|-id=114 bgcolor=#d6d6d6
| 458114 ||  || — || February 7, 2010 || La Sagra || OAM Obs. || — || align=right | 2.7 km || 
|-id=115 bgcolor=#d6d6d6
| 458115 ||  || — || February 9, 2010 || Catalina || CSS || — || align=right | 2.5 km || 
|-id=116 bgcolor=#FFC2E0
| 458116 || 2010 DA || — || February 16, 2010 || Siding Spring || SSS || APOPHAcritical || align=right data-sort-value="0.32" | 320 m || 
|-id=117 bgcolor=#d6d6d6
| 458117 ||  || — || February 17, 2010 || Kitt Peak || Spacewatch || — || align=right | 3.3 km || 
|-id=118 bgcolor=#d6d6d6
| 458118 ||  || — || August 29, 2006 || Kitt Peak || Spacewatch || (260)7:4 || align=right | 3.3 km || 
|-id=119 bgcolor=#d6d6d6
| 458119 ||  || — || November 24, 2009 || Kitt Peak || Spacewatch || — || align=right | 3.8 km || 
|-id=120 bgcolor=#d6d6d6
| 458120 ||  || — || February 16, 2010 || Catalina || CSS || — || align=right | 5.2 km || 
|-id=121 bgcolor=#d6d6d6
| 458121 ||  || — || March 3, 2010 || WISE || WISE || — || align=right | 3.0 km || 
|-id=122 bgcolor=#FFC2E0
| 458122 ||  || — || March 15, 2010 || Mount Lemmon || Mount Lemmon Survey || APO +1kmPHA || align=right | 1.0 km || 
|-id=123 bgcolor=#d6d6d6
| 458123 ||  || — || March 12, 2010 || Catalina || CSS || — || align=right | 3.0 km || 
|-id=124 bgcolor=#d6d6d6
| 458124 ||  || — || March 13, 2010 || Mount Lemmon || Mount Lemmon Survey || — || align=right | 3.5 km || 
|-id=125 bgcolor=#d6d6d6
| 458125 ||  || — || March 12, 2010 || Catalina || CSS || — || align=right | 4.7 km || 
|-id=126 bgcolor=#fefefe
| 458126 ||  || — || March 14, 2010 || Kitt Peak || Spacewatch || — || align=right data-sort-value="0.51" | 510 m || 
|-id=127 bgcolor=#d6d6d6
| 458127 ||  || — || March 15, 2010 || La Sagra || OAM Obs. || — || align=right | 4.6 km || 
|-id=128 bgcolor=#fefefe
| 458128 ||  || — || March 12, 2010 || Kitt Peak || Spacewatch || — || align=right data-sort-value="0.50" | 500 m || 
|-id=129 bgcolor=#d6d6d6
| 458129 ||  || — || March 14, 2010 || Kitt Peak || Spacewatch || — || align=right | 4.8 km || 
|-id=130 bgcolor=#d6d6d6
| 458130 ||  || — || December 17, 2009 || Mount Lemmon || Mount Lemmon Survey || — || align=right | 3.1 km || 
|-id=131 bgcolor=#fefefe
| 458131 ||  || — || January 19, 2010 || WISE || WISE || — || align=right | 1.9 km || 
|-id=132 bgcolor=#d6d6d6
| 458132 ||  || — || March 2, 2005 || Socorro || LINEAR || — || align=right | 4.0 km || 
|-id=133 bgcolor=#d6d6d6
| 458133 ||  || — || December 20, 2009 || Mount Lemmon || Mount Lemmon Survey || — || align=right | 4.4 km || 
|-id=134 bgcolor=#fefefe
| 458134 ||  || — || March 21, 2010 || Catalina || CSS || — || align=right data-sort-value="0.65" | 650 m || 
|-id=135 bgcolor=#FFC2E0
| 458135 ||  || — || April 1, 2010 || WISE || WISE || AMO || align=right data-sort-value="0.3" | 300 m || 
|-id=136 bgcolor=#d6d6d6
| 458136 ||  || — || February 15, 2010 || Catalina || CSS || — || align=right | 3.6 km || 
|-id=137 bgcolor=#fefefe
| 458137 ||  || — || April 4, 2010 || Kitt Peak || Spacewatch || — || align=right data-sort-value="0.65" | 650 m || 
|-id=138 bgcolor=#fefefe
| 458138 ||  || — || April 18, 2010 || WISE || WISE || — || align=right | 2.3 km || 
|-id=139 bgcolor=#d6d6d6
| 458139 ||  || — || April 12, 2005 || Kitt Peak || Spacewatch || — || align=right | 3.7 km || 
|-id=140 bgcolor=#C2FFFF
| 458140 ||  || — || April 24, 2010 || WISE || WISE || L5 || align=right | 13 km || 
|-id=141 bgcolor=#fefefe
| 458141 ||  || — || April 25, 2010 || WISE || WISE || — || align=right | 1.4 km || 
|-id=142 bgcolor=#d6d6d6
| 458142 ||  || — || April 26, 2010 || WISE || WISE || — || align=right | 2.9 km || 
|-id=143 bgcolor=#d6d6d6
| 458143 ||  || — || February 17, 2010 || Mount Lemmon || Mount Lemmon Survey || — || align=right | 5.0 km || 
|-id=144 bgcolor=#d6d6d6
| 458144 ||  || — || April 30, 2010 || WISE || WISE || THB || align=right | 2.7 km || 
|-id=145 bgcolor=#FA8072
| 458145 ||  || — || May 1, 2010 || WISE || WISE || — || align=right | 1.7 km || 
|-id=146 bgcolor=#d6d6d6
| 458146 ||  || — || January 12, 2010 || Mount Lemmon || Mount Lemmon Survey || 7:4 || align=right | 4.5 km || 
|-id=147 bgcolor=#fefefe
| 458147 ||  || — || May 3, 2010 || Kitt Peak || Spacewatch || — || align=right data-sort-value="0.71" | 710 m || 
|-id=148 bgcolor=#fefefe
| 458148 ||  || — || April 11, 2010 || Mount Lemmon || Mount Lemmon Survey || — || align=right data-sort-value="0.67" | 670 m || 
|-id=149 bgcolor=#fefefe
| 458149 ||  || — || May 4, 2010 || Kitt Peak || Spacewatch || — || align=right data-sort-value="0.75" | 750 m || 
|-id=150 bgcolor=#E9E9E9
| 458150 ||  || — || May 7, 2010 || WISE || WISE || critical || align=right | 1.8 km || 
|-id=151 bgcolor=#fefefe
| 458151 ||  || — || May 11, 2010 || Mount Lemmon || Mount Lemmon Survey || — || align=right data-sort-value="0.50" | 500 m || 
|-id=152 bgcolor=#fefefe
| 458152 ||  || — || April 11, 2010 || Mount Lemmon || Mount Lemmon Survey || — || align=right data-sort-value="0.70" | 700 m || 
|-id=153 bgcolor=#fefefe
| 458153 ||  || — || May 7, 2010 || Mount Lemmon || Mount Lemmon Survey || — || align=right data-sort-value="0.66" | 660 m || 
|-id=154 bgcolor=#fefefe
| 458154 ||  || — || May 7, 2010 || Kitt Peak || Spacewatch || — || align=right | 1.4 km || 
|-id=155 bgcolor=#d6d6d6
| 458155 ||  || — || March 2, 2009 || Kitt Peak || Spacewatch || 3:2 || align=right | 3.6 km || 
|-id=156 bgcolor=#d6d6d6
| 458156 ||  || — || May 12, 2010 || WISE || WISE || — || align=right | 4.7 km || 
|-id=157 bgcolor=#fefefe
| 458157 ||  || — || April 25, 2010 || Kitt Peak || Spacewatch || — || align=right data-sort-value="0.79" | 790 m || 
|-id=158 bgcolor=#E9E9E9
| 458158 ||  || — || May 4, 2010 || Kitt Peak || Spacewatch || EUN || align=right data-sort-value="0.91" | 910 m || 
|-id=159 bgcolor=#d6d6d6
| 458159 ||  || — || June 18, 2007 || Kitt Peak || Spacewatch || — || align=right | 4.9 km || 
|-id=160 bgcolor=#fefefe
| 458160 ||  || — || March 5, 2006 || Kitt Peak || Spacewatch || V || align=right data-sort-value="0.68" | 680 m || 
|-id=161 bgcolor=#E9E9E9
| 458161 ||  || — || October 23, 2006 || Catalina || CSS || — || align=right | 2.0 km || 
|-id=162 bgcolor=#E9E9E9
| 458162 ||  || — || May 22, 2010 || WISE || WISE || — || align=right | 1.7 km || 
|-id=163 bgcolor=#E9E9E9
| 458163 ||  || — || May 26, 2010 || WISE || WISE || — || align=right | 2.0 km || 
|-id=164 bgcolor=#fefefe
| 458164 ||  || — || May 30, 2010 || WISE || WISE || — || align=right | 3.0 km || 
|-id=165 bgcolor=#fefefe
| 458165 ||  || — || June 3, 2010 || Kitt Peak || Spacewatch || V || align=right data-sort-value="0.51" | 510 m || 
|-id=166 bgcolor=#E9E9E9
| 458166 ||  || — || June 2, 2010 || WISE || WISE || — || align=right | 2.3 km || 
|-id=167 bgcolor=#E9E9E9
| 458167 ||  || — || October 16, 2006 || Catalina || CSS || — || align=right | 2.1 km || 
|-id=168 bgcolor=#E9E9E9
| 458168 ||  || — || July 22, 2006 || Mount Lemmon || Mount Lemmon Survey || ADE || align=right | 2.0 km || 
|-id=169 bgcolor=#E9E9E9
| 458169 ||  || — || June 13, 2010 || WISE || WISE || — || align=right | 2.1 km || 
|-id=170 bgcolor=#E9E9E9
| 458170 ||  || — || June 19, 2010 || Mount Lemmon || Mount Lemmon Survey || — || align=right | 1.5 km || 
|-id=171 bgcolor=#E9E9E9
| 458171 ||  || — || June 17, 2010 || WISE || WISE || — || align=right | 2.0 km || 
|-id=172 bgcolor=#E9E9E9
| 458172 ||  || — || June 17, 2010 || WISE || WISE || — || align=right | 3.1 km || 
|-id=173 bgcolor=#E9E9E9
| 458173 ||  || — || June 21, 2010 || WISE || WISE || — || align=right | 1.9 km || 
|-id=174 bgcolor=#E9E9E9
| 458174 ||  || — || June 23, 2010 || WISE || WISE || — || align=right | 2.4 km || 
|-id=175 bgcolor=#E9E9E9
| 458175 ||  || — || June 24, 2010 || WISE || WISE || — || align=right | 2.3 km || 
|-id=176 bgcolor=#fefefe
| 458176 ||  || — || June 25, 2010 || WISE || WISE || (5026) || align=right | 1.7 km || 
|-id=177 bgcolor=#fefefe
| 458177 ||  || — || June 24, 2010 || Mount Lemmon || Mount Lemmon Survey || — || align=right data-sort-value="0.90" | 900 m || 
|-id=178 bgcolor=#fefefe
| 458178 ||  || — || July 6, 2010 || Socorro || LINEAR || — || align=right | 1.1 km || 
|-id=179 bgcolor=#fefefe
| 458179 ||  || — || April 20, 2010 || WISE || WISE || — || align=right | 2.5 km || 
|-id=180 bgcolor=#E9E9E9
| 458180 ||  || — || July 6, 2010 || WISE || WISE || KON || align=right | 1.7 km || 
|-id=181 bgcolor=#d6d6d6
| 458181 ||  || — || July 7, 2010 || WISE || WISE || — || align=right | 3.5 km || 
|-id=182 bgcolor=#E9E9E9
| 458182 ||  || — || January 27, 2007 || Kitt Peak || Spacewatch || — || align=right | 1.7 km || 
|-id=183 bgcolor=#E9E9E9
| 458183 ||  || — || July 10, 2010 || WISE || WISE || — || align=right | 2.1 km || 
|-id=184 bgcolor=#fefefe
| 458184 ||  || — || July 14, 2010 || WISE || WISE || — || align=right | 1.3 km || 
|-id=185 bgcolor=#E9E9E9
| 458185 ||  || — || July 15, 2010 || WISE || WISE || GEF || align=right | 2.5 km || 
|-id=186 bgcolor=#E9E9E9
| 458186 ||  || — || October 3, 1997 || Caussols || ODAS || — || align=right | 1.8 km || 
|-id=187 bgcolor=#E9E9E9
| 458187 ||  || — || July 15, 2010 || WISE || WISE || — || align=right | 1.4 km || 
|-id=188 bgcolor=#E9E9E9
| 458188 ||  || — || July 16, 2010 || WISE || WISE || — || align=right | 1.7 km || 
|-id=189 bgcolor=#E9E9E9
| 458189 ||  || — || October 23, 2006 || Kitt Peak || Spacewatch || — || align=right | 1.6 km || 
|-id=190 bgcolor=#E9E9E9
| 458190 ||  || — || July 27, 2010 || WISE || WISE || — || align=right | 2.6 km || 
|-id=191 bgcolor=#E9E9E9
| 458191 ||  || — || July 28, 2010 || WISE || WISE || — || align=right | 2.4 km || 
|-id=192 bgcolor=#E9E9E9
| 458192 ||  || — || August 1, 2010 || WISE || WISE || — || align=right | 3.1 km || 
|-id=193 bgcolor=#E9E9E9
| 458193 ||  || — || August 3, 2010 || WISE || WISE || — || align=right | 2.8 km || 
|-id=194 bgcolor=#fefefe
| 458194 ||  || — || October 16, 2007 || Kitt Peak || Spacewatch || — || align=right data-sort-value="0.66" | 660 m || 
|-id=195 bgcolor=#E9E9E9
| 458195 ||  || — || October 31, 2006 || Catalina || CSS || — || align=right | 1.6 km || 
|-id=196 bgcolor=#E9E9E9
| 458196 ||  || — || June 13, 2010 || Mount Lemmon || Mount Lemmon Survey || MAR || align=right | 1.2 km || 
|-id=197 bgcolor=#fefefe
| 458197 ||  || — || August 18, 2010 || XuYi || PMO NEO || — || align=right data-sort-value="0.93" | 930 m || 
|-id=198 bgcolor=#FFC2E0
| 458198 ||  || — || September 2, 2010 || Mount Lemmon || Mount Lemmon Survey || AMO || align=right data-sort-value="0.55" | 550 m || 
|-id=199 bgcolor=#E9E9E9
| 458199 ||  || — || September 4, 2010 || Mount Lemmon || Mount Lemmon Survey || — || align=right | 2.1 km || 
|-id=200 bgcolor=#E9E9E9
| 458200 ||  || — || September 3, 2010 || Socorro || LINEAR || — || align=right | 1.6 km || 
|}

458201–458300 

|-bgcolor=#fefefe
| 458201 ||  || — || September 18, 2003 || Kitt Peak || Spacewatch || — || align=right data-sort-value="0.65" | 650 m || 
|-id=202 bgcolor=#E9E9E9
| 458202 ||  || — || July 21, 2006 || Mount Lemmon || Mount Lemmon Survey || — || align=right | 1.8 km || 
|-id=203 bgcolor=#E9E9E9
| 458203 ||  || — || October 19, 2006 || Mount Lemmon || Mount Lemmon Survey || — || align=right | 1.1 km || 
|-id=204 bgcolor=#E9E9E9
| 458204 ||  || — || September 6, 2010 || Socorro || LINEAR || — || align=right | 1.8 km || 
|-id=205 bgcolor=#d6d6d6
| 458205 ||  || — || September 6, 2010 || Kitt Peak || Spacewatch || KOR || align=right | 1.4 km || 
|-id=206 bgcolor=#E9E9E9
| 458206 ||  || — || September 6, 2010 || Kitt Peak || Spacewatch || MAR || align=right | 1.2 km || 
|-id=207 bgcolor=#E9E9E9
| 458207 ||  || — || September 9, 2010 || Kachina || J. Hobart || — || align=right | 1.5 km || 
|-id=208 bgcolor=#E9E9E9
| 458208 ||  || — || October 19, 2006 || Catalina || CSS || — || align=right | 1.5 km || 
|-id=209 bgcolor=#fefefe
| 458209 ||  || — || September 6, 2010 || Socorro || LINEAR || V || align=right data-sort-value="0.77" | 770 m || 
|-id=210 bgcolor=#E9E9E9
| 458210 ||  || — || September 10, 2010 || Mount Lemmon || Mount Lemmon Survey || — || align=right | 1.3 km || 
|-id=211 bgcolor=#fefefe
| 458211 ||  || — || September 7, 1999 || Kitt Peak || Spacewatch || — || align=right data-sort-value="0.79" | 790 m || 
|-id=212 bgcolor=#E9E9E9
| 458212 ||  || — || September 2, 2010 || Mount Lemmon || Mount Lemmon Survey || — || align=right | 1.5 km || 
|-id=213 bgcolor=#E9E9E9
| 458213 ||  || — || September 3, 2010 || La Sagra || OAM Obs. || JUN || align=right | 1.1 km || 
|-id=214 bgcolor=#E9E9E9
| 458214 ||  || — || September 10, 2010 || Kitt Peak || Spacewatch || — || align=right | 1.8 km || 
|-id=215 bgcolor=#E9E9E9
| 458215 ||  || — || September 10, 2010 || Kitt Peak || Spacewatch || — || align=right | 1.3 km || 
|-id=216 bgcolor=#E9E9E9
| 458216 ||  || — || July 6, 2010 || WISE || WISE || — || align=right | 1.9 km || 
|-id=217 bgcolor=#E9E9E9
| 458217 ||  || — || September 11, 2010 || Kitt Peak || Spacewatch || — || align=right | 1.2 km || 
|-id=218 bgcolor=#E9E9E9
| 458218 ||  || — || November 20, 2006 || Kitt Peak || Spacewatch || — || align=right | 1.2 km || 
|-id=219 bgcolor=#fefefe
| 458219 ||  || — || December 30, 2007 || Kitt Peak || Spacewatch || — || align=right data-sort-value="0.80" | 800 m || 
|-id=220 bgcolor=#E9E9E9
| 458220 ||  || — || September 10, 2010 || Kitt Peak || Spacewatch || — || align=right | 1.0 km || 
|-id=221 bgcolor=#E9E9E9
| 458221 ||  || — || September 14, 2010 || Kitt Peak || Spacewatch || — || align=right | 1.7 km || 
|-id=222 bgcolor=#E9E9E9
| 458222 ||  || — || September 14, 2010 || Kitt Peak || Spacewatch || — || align=right | 1.8 km || 
|-id=223 bgcolor=#E9E9E9
| 458223 ||  || — || September 4, 2010 || Kitt Peak || Spacewatch || — || align=right | 1.9 km || 
|-id=224 bgcolor=#fefefe
| 458224 ||  || — || September 19, 2003 || Kitt Peak || Spacewatch || — || align=right data-sort-value="0.85" | 850 m || 
|-id=225 bgcolor=#E9E9E9
| 458225 ||  || — || August 13, 2010 || Kitt Peak || Spacewatch || — || align=right data-sort-value="0.77" | 770 m || 
|-id=226 bgcolor=#E9E9E9
| 458226 ||  || — || September 10, 2010 || Kitt Peak || Spacewatch || critical || align=right | 1.3 km || 
|-id=227 bgcolor=#E9E9E9
| 458227 ||  || — || September 10, 2010 || Mount Lemmon || Mount Lemmon Survey || — || align=right | 1.4 km || 
|-id=228 bgcolor=#E9E9E9
| 458228 ||  || — || September 16, 2010 || Mount Lemmon || Mount Lemmon Survey || — || align=right | 1.8 km || 
|-id=229 bgcolor=#d6d6d6
| 458229 ||  || — || August 28, 2005 || Kitt Peak || Spacewatch || KOR || align=right | 1.3 km || 
|-id=230 bgcolor=#E9E9E9
| 458230 ||  || — || September 16, 2010 || Kitt Peak || Spacewatch || JUN || align=right | 1.0 km || 
|-id=231 bgcolor=#E9E9E9
| 458231 ||  || — || September 19, 2001 || Kitt Peak || Spacewatch || — || align=right | 1.3 km || 
|-id=232 bgcolor=#d6d6d6
| 458232 ||  || — || April 4, 2003 || Kitt Peak || Spacewatch || — || align=right | 2.6 km || 
|-id=233 bgcolor=#E9E9E9
| 458233 ||  || — || October 22, 2006 || Kitt Peak || Spacewatch || — || align=right | 1.4 km || 
|-id=234 bgcolor=#E9E9E9
| 458234 ||  || — || October 1, 2010 || Kitt Peak || Spacewatch || — || align=right | 1.8 km || 
|-id=235 bgcolor=#E9E9E9
| 458235 ||  || — || September 18, 2010 || Mount Lemmon || Mount Lemmon Survey || JUN || align=right | 1.1 km || 
|-id=236 bgcolor=#E9E9E9
| 458236 ||  || — || October 3, 2010 || Kitt Peak || Spacewatch || — || align=right | 1.0 km || 
|-id=237 bgcolor=#E9E9E9
| 458237 ||  || — || October 23, 2006 || Mount Lemmon || Mount Lemmon Survey || — || align=right | 1.3 km || 
|-id=238 bgcolor=#E9E9E9
| 458238 ||  || — || September 27, 2006 || Mount Lemmon || Mount Lemmon Survey || — || align=right | 1.3 km || 
|-id=239 bgcolor=#fefefe
| 458239 ||  || — || March 31, 2001 || Kitt Peak || Spacewatch || — || align=right | 1.0 km || 
|-id=240 bgcolor=#E9E9E9
| 458240 ||  || — || November 17, 2006 || Kitt Peak || Spacewatch || — || align=right | 1.4 km || 
|-id=241 bgcolor=#E9E9E9
| 458241 ||  || — || September 19, 2010 || Kitt Peak || Spacewatch || — || align=right | 1.5 km || 
|-id=242 bgcolor=#E9E9E9
| 458242 ||  || — || November 11, 2006 || Mount Lemmon || Mount Lemmon Survey || — || align=right | 1.1 km || 
|-id=243 bgcolor=#fefefe
| 458243 ||  || — || April 29, 2009 || Siding Spring || SSS || — || align=right data-sort-value="0.85" | 850 m || 
|-id=244 bgcolor=#E9E9E9
| 458244 ||  || — || September 17, 2010 || Mount Lemmon || Mount Lemmon Survey || — || align=right | 1.8 km || 
|-id=245 bgcolor=#E9E9E9
| 458245 ||  || — || September 16, 2010 || Kitt Peak || Spacewatch || — || align=right data-sort-value="0.86" | 860 m || 
|-id=246 bgcolor=#E9E9E9
| 458246 ||  || — || July 16, 2010 || WISE || WISE || critical || align=right | 2.3 km || 
|-id=247 bgcolor=#E9E9E9
| 458247 ||  || — || September 1, 2010 || Mount Lemmon || Mount Lemmon Survey || — || align=right | 1.3 km || 
|-id=248 bgcolor=#E9E9E9
| 458248 ||  || — || September 14, 2010 || Kitt Peak || Spacewatch || AGN || align=right data-sort-value="0.98" | 980 m || 
|-id=249 bgcolor=#E9E9E9
| 458249 ||  || — || September 10, 2010 || Kitt Peak || Spacewatch || — || align=right data-sort-value="0.73" | 730 m || 
|-id=250 bgcolor=#fefefe
| 458250 ||  || — || September 4, 2010 || Kitt Peak || Spacewatch || NYS || align=right data-sort-value="0.54" | 540 m || 
|-id=251 bgcolor=#fefefe
| 458251 ||  || — || October 9, 2010 || Kitt Peak || Spacewatch || — || align=right data-sort-value="0.89" | 890 m || 
|-id=252 bgcolor=#E9E9E9
| 458252 ||  || — || October 21, 2006 || Kitt Peak || Spacewatch || — || align=right data-sort-value="0.61" | 610 m || 
|-id=253 bgcolor=#E9E9E9
| 458253 ||  || — || October 23, 2006 || Kitt Peak || Spacewatch || — || align=right data-sort-value="0.78" | 780 m || 
|-id=254 bgcolor=#E9E9E9
| 458254 ||  || — || October 3, 2010 || Catalina || CSS || — || align=right | 1.4 km || 
|-id=255 bgcolor=#E9E9E9
| 458255 ||  || — || October 11, 2010 || Mount Lemmon || Mount Lemmon Survey || — || align=right | 1.9 km || 
|-id=256 bgcolor=#E9E9E9
| 458256 ||  || — || November 13, 2006 || Kitt Peak || Spacewatch || — || align=right | 1.5 km || 
|-id=257 bgcolor=#E9E9E9
| 458257 ||  || — || October 1, 2010 || Mount Lemmon || Mount Lemmon Survey || (5) || align=right data-sort-value="0.74" | 740 m || 
|-id=258 bgcolor=#E9E9E9
| 458258 ||  || — || May 15, 2005 || Mount Lemmon || Mount Lemmon Survey || — || align=right | 2.7 km || 
|-id=259 bgcolor=#E9E9E9
| 458259 ||  || — || October 7, 2010 || Socorro || LINEAR || — || align=right | 1.4 km || 
|-id=260 bgcolor=#E9E9E9
| 458260 ||  || — || July 12, 2010 || WISE || WISE || — || align=right | 2.3 km || 
|-id=261 bgcolor=#E9E9E9
| 458261 ||  || — || November 17, 2006 || Kitt Peak || Spacewatch || — || align=right | 1.6 km || 
|-id=262 bgcolor=#E9E9E9
| 458262 ||  || — || November 1, 2006 || Mount Lemmon || Mount Lemmon Survey || — || align=right | 1.3 km || 
|-id=263 bgcolor=#E9E9E9
| 458263 ||  || — || October 13, 2010 || Catalina || CSS || — || align=right | 2.0 km || 
|-id=264 bgcolor=#E9E9E9
| 458264 ||  || — || November 10, 2006 || Kitt Peak || Spacewatch || — || align=right data-sort-value="0.81" | 810 m || 
|-id=265 bgcolor=#d6d6d6
| 458265 ||  || — || October 17, 2010 || Mount Lemmon || Mount Lemmon Survey || — || align=right | 2.3 km || 
|-id=266 bgcolor=#E9E9E9
| 458266 ||  || — || September 16, 2010 || Mount Lemmon || Mount Lemmon Survey || — || align=right | 1.6 km || 
|-id=267 bgcolor=#E9E9E9
| 458267 ||  || — || July 16, 2010 || WISE || WISE || — || align=right | 1.7 km || 
|-id=268 bgcolor=#E9E9E9
| 458268 ||  || — || November 15, 2001 || Kitt Peak || Spacewatch || — || align=right | 2.7 km || 
|-id=269 bgcolor=#E9E9E9
| 458269 ||  || — || September 17, 2010 || Mount Lemmon || Mount Lemmon Survey || — || align=right | 1.3 km || 
|-id=270 bgcolor=#E9E9E9
| 458270 ||  || — || October 28, 2010 || Mount Lemmon || Mount Lemmon Survey || NEM || align=right | 2.2 km || 
|-id=271 bgcolor=#E9E9E9
| 458271 ||  || — || November 10, 2006 || Kitt Peak || Spacewatch || — || align=right data-sort-value="0.90" | 900 m || 
|-id=272 bgcolor=#d6d6d6
| 458272 ||  || — || October 28, 2010 || Mount Lemmon || Mount Lemmon Survey || EOS || align=right | 2.2 km || 
|-id=273 bgcolor=#E9E9E9
| 458273 ||  || — || October 13, 2010 || Mount Lemmon || Mount Lemmon Survey || HOF || align=right | 1.9 km || 
|-id=274 bgcolor=#E9E9E9
| 458274 ||  || — || July 29, 2010 || WISE || WISE || — || align=right | 1.8 km || 
|-id=275 bgcolor=#E9E9E9
| 458275 ||  || — || October 29, 2010 || Mount Lemmon || Mount Lemmon Survey || — || align=right | 1.6 km || 
|-id=276 bgcolor=#E9E9E9
| 458276 ||  || — || March 5, 2008 || Mount Lemmon || Mount Lemmon Survey || — || align=right data-sort-value="0.89" | 890 m || 
|-id=277 bgcolor=#E9E9E9
| 458277 ||  || — || September 18, 2010 || Mount Lemmon || Mount Lemmon Survey || — || align=right | 1.4 km || 
|-id=278 bgcolor=#E9E9E9
| 458278 ||  || — || September 17, 2010 || Mount Lemmon || Mount Lemmon Survey || — || align=right | 1.8 km || 
|-id=279 bgcolor=#E9E9E9
| 458279 ||  || — || September 28, 2006 || Mount Lemmon || Mount Lemmon Survey || — || align=right data-sort-value="0.89" | 890 m || 
|-id=280 bgcolor=#E9E9E9
| 458280 ||  || — || October 29, 2010 || Kitt Peak || Spacewatch || — || align=right | 1.7 km || 
|-id=281 bgcolor=#E9E9E9
| 458281 ||  || — || September 5, 2010 || Mount Lemmon || Mount Lemmon Survey || — || align=right | 2.0 km || 
|-id=282 bgcolor=#E9E9E9
| 458282 ||  || — || October 9, 2005 || Kitt Peak || Spacewatch || MRX || align=right | 1.1 km || 
|-id=283 bgcolor=#E9E9E9
| 458283 ||  || — || March 24, 2003 || Socorro || LINEAR || — || align=right | 1.9 km || 
|-id=284 bgcolor=#E9E9E9
| 458284 ||  || — || March 13, 2008 || Kitt Peak || Spacewatch || — || align=right | 1.2 km || 
|-id=285 bgcolor=#E9E9E9
| 458285 ||  || — || April 25, 2004 || Kitt Peak || Spacewatch || — || align=right | 2.3 km || 
|-id=286 bgcolor=#E9E9E9
| 458286 ||  || — || October 17, 2010 || Catalina || CSS || — || align=right | 1.8 km || 
|-id=287 bgcolor=#E9E9E9
| 458287 ||  || — || October 29, 2010 || Kitt Peak || Spacewatch || — || align=right | 1.4 km || 
|-id=288 bgcolor=#E9E9E9
| 458288 ||  || — || November 17, 2001 || Kitt Peak || Spacewatch || — || align=right | 2.3 km || 
|-id=289 bgcolor=#E9E9E9
| 458289 ||  || — || October 30, 2010 || Mount Lemmon || Mount Lemmon Survey || — || align=right | 1.4 km || 
|-id=290 bgcolor=#E9E9E9
| 458290 ||  || — || October 30, 2010 || Mount Lemmon || Mount Lemmon Survey || — || align=right | 1.7 km || 
|-id=291 bgcolor=#E9E9E9
| 458291 ||  || — || October 31, 2010 || Mount Lemmon || Mount Lemmon Survey || — || align=right | 1.3 km || 
|-id=292 bgcolor=#E9E9E9
| 458292 ||  || — || January 12, 2008 || Kitt Peak || Spacewatch || — || align=right data-sort-value="0.88" | 880 m || 
|-id=293 bgcolor=#E9E9E9
| 458293 ||  || — || October 29, 2010 || Kitt Peak || Spacewatch || JUN || align=right | 1.0 km || 
|-id=294 bgcolor=#E9E9E9
| 458294 ||  || — || September 15, 2010 || Catalina || CSS || — || align=right | 1.7 km || 
|-id=295 bgcolor=#E9E9E9
| 458295 ||  || — || August 12, 2010 || Kitt Peak || Spacewatch || — || align=right | 1.7 km || 
|-id=296 bgcolor=#fefefe
| 458296 ||  || — || August 21, 2006 || Kitt Peak || Spacewatch || — || align=right data-sort-value="0.98" | 980 m || 
|-id=297 bgcolor=#E9E9E9
| 458297 ||  || — || October 19, 2010 || Catalina || CSS || — || align=right | 1.7 km || 
|-id=298 bgcolor=#E9E9E9
| 458298 ||  || — || October 14, 2010 || Mount Lemmon || Mount Lemmon Survey || — || align=right | 1.4 km || 
|-id=299 bgcolor=#E9E9E9
| 458299 ||  || — || November 1, 2010 || Kitt Peak || Spacewatch || EUN || align=right | 1.3 km || 
|-id=300 bgcolor=#E9E9E9
| 458300 ||  || — || January 1, 2003 || Kitt Peak || Spacewatch || — || align=right | 1.3 km || 
|}

458301–458400 

|-bgcolor=#E9E9E9
| 458301 ||  || — || October 12, 2010 || Mount Lemmon || Mount Lemmon Survey || — || align=right | 1.7 km || 
|-id=302 bgcolor=#E9E9E9
| 458302 ||  || — || November 2, 2010 || Mount Lemmon || Mount Lemmon Survey || — || align=right | 1.7 km || 
|-id=303 bgcolor=#E9E9E9
| 458303 ||  || — || October 25, 2005 || Kitt Peak || Spacewatch || — || align=right | 1.5 km || 
|-id=304 bgcolor=#E9E9E9
| 458304 ||  || — || October 12, 2010 || Mount Lemmon || Mount Lemmon Survey || — || align=right | 2.6 km || 
|-id=305 bgcolor=#E9E9E9
| 458305 ||  || — || December 10, 2006 || Kitt Peak || Spacewatch || — || align=right | 1.5 km || 
|-id=306 bgcolor=#E9E9E9
| 458306 ||  || — || October 17, 2010 || Mount Lemmon || Mount Lemmon Survey || AGN || align=right data-sort-value="0.80" | 800 m || 
|-id=307 bgcolor=#E9E9E9
| 458307 ||  || — || November 14, 2006 || Kitt Peak || Spacewatch || — || align=right | 1.2 km || 
|-id=308 bgcolor=#d6d6d6
| 458308 ||  || — || November 2, 2010 || Kitt Peak || Spacewatch || — || align=right | 2.1 km || 
|-id=309 bgcolor=#E9E9E9
| 458309 ||  || — || September 11, 2010 || Mount Lemmon || Mount Lemmon Survey || — || align=right | 1.4 km || 
|-id=310 bgcolor=#E9E9E9
| 458310 ||  || — || September 13, 2005 || Kitt Peak || Spacewatch || — || align=right | 1.5 km || 
|-id=311 bgcolor=#E9E9E9
| 458311 ||  || — || July 31, 2010 || WISE || WISE || — || align=right | 1.2 km || 
|-id=312 bgcolor=#E9E9E9
| 458312 ||  || — || October 29, 2010 || Mount Lemmon || Mount Lemmon Survey || — || align=right | 1.3 km || 
|-id=313 bgcolor=#E9E9E9
| 458313 ||  || — || December 17, 2001 || Socorro || LINEAR || — || align=right | 2.0 km || 
|-id=314 bgcolor=#E9E9E9
| 458314 ||  || — || November 5, 2010 || Kitt Peak || Spacewatch || — || align=right | 1.6 km || 
|-id=315 bgcolor=#E9E9E9
| 458315 ||  || — || November 5, 2010 || Kitt Peak || Spacewatch || — || align=right | 1.2 km || 
|-id=316 bgcolor=#E9E9E9
| 458316 ||  || — || November 18, 2006 || Kitt Peak || Spacewatch || EUN || align=right | 1.1 km || 
|-id=317 bgcolor=#E9E9E9
| 458317 ||  || — || October 29, 2010 || Kitt Peak || Spacewatch || — || align=right | 2.5 km || 
|-id=318 bgcolor=#E9E9E9
| 458318 ||  || — || October 29, 2010 || Kitt Peak || Spacewatch || — || align=right | 2.5 km || 
|-id=319 bgcolor=#E9E9E9
| 458319 ||  || — || August 9, 2010 || WISE || WISE || DOR || align=right | 2.9 km || 
|-id=320 bgcolor=#d6d6d6
| 458320 ||  || — || November 8, 2010 || Kitt Peak || Spacewatch || — || align=right | 3.0 km || 
|-id=321 bgcolor=#E9E9E9
| 458321 ||  || — || December 24, 2006 || Kitt Peak || Spacewatch || — || align=right | 1.2 km || 
|-id=322 bgcolor=#E9E9E9
| 458322 ||  || — || November 5, 2010 || Kitt Peak || Spacewatch || — || align=right | 1.8 km || 
|-id=323 bgcolor=#E9E9E9
| 458323 ||  || — || November 5, 2010 || Mount Lemmon || Mount Lemmon Survey || — || align=right | 1.3 km || 
|-id=324 bgcolor=#E9E9E9
| 458324 ||  || — || April 5, 2008 || Mount Lemmon || Mount Lemmon Survey || — || align=right | 1.9 km || 
|-id=325 bgcolor=#E9E9E9
| 458325 ||  || — || November 6, 2010 || Mount Lemmon || Mount Lemmon Survey || — || align=right | 1.8 km || 
|-id=326 bgcolor=#E9E9E9
| 458326 ||  || — || October 29, 2010 || Mount Lemmon || Mount Lemmon Survey || — || align=right | 1.8 km || 
|-id=327 bgcolor=#E9E9E9
| 458327 ||  || — || November 8, 2010 || Kitt Peak || Spacewatch || GEF || align=right | 1.3 km || 
|-id=328 bgcolor=#E9E9E9
| 458328 ||  || — || December 2, 1996 || Kitt Peak || Spacewatch || GEF || align=right | 1.2 km || 
|-id=329 bgcolor=#E9E9E9
| 458329 ||  || — || January 10, 2008 || Mount Lemmon || Mount Lemmon Survey || — || align=right data-sort-value="0.93" | 930 m || 
|-id=330 bgcolor=#E9E9E9
| 458330 ||  || — || October 30, 2010 || Catalina || CSS || EUN || align=right | 1.5 km || 
|-id=331 bgcolor=#E9E9E9
| 458331 ||  || — || September 19, 2001 || Kitt Peak || Spacewatch || LEO || align=right | 1.6 km || 
|-id=332 bgcolor=#E9E9E9
| 458332 ||  || — || April 12, 2008 || Kitt Peak || Spacewatch || — || align=right | 1.9 km || 
|-id=333 bgcolor=#E9E9E9
| 458333 ||  || — || November 2, 2010 || Mount Lemmon || Mount Lemmon Survey || — || align=right | 1.2 km || 
|-id=334 bgcolor=#E9E9E9
| 458334 ||  || — || November 1, 2010 || Kitt Peak || Spacewatch || EUN || align=right | 1.1 km || 
|-id=335 bgcolor=#E9E9E9
| 458335 ||  || — || September 10, 2010 || Kitt Peak || Spacewatch || — || align=right | 1.9 km || 
|-id=336 bgcolor=#E9E9E9
| 458336 ||  || — || April 25, 2000 || Kitt Peak || Spacewatch || — || align=right | 1.6 km || 
|-id=337 bgcolor=#fefefe
| 458337 ||  || — || February 4, 2006 || Catalina || CSS || H || align=right data-sort-value="0.84" | 840 m || 
|-id=338 bgcolor=#E9E9E9
| 458338 ||  || — || November 6, 2010 || Mount Lemmon || Mount Lemmon Survey ||  || align=right | 2.1 km || 
|-id=339 bgcolor=#E9E9E9
| 458339 ||  || — || November 6, 2010 || Mount Lemmon || Mount Lemmon Survey || — || align=right | 1.9 km || 
|-id=340 bgcolor=#E9E9E9
| 458340 ||  || — || August 27, 2005 || Kitt Peak || Spacewatch || — || align=right | 1.8 km || 
|-id=341 bgcolor=#E9E9E9
| 458341 ||  || — || November 2, 2010 || Kitt Peak || Spacewatch || — || align=right | 2.0 km || 
|-id=342 bgcolor=#E9E9E9
| 458342 ||  || — || October 14, 2010 || Mount Lemmon || Mount Lemmon Survey || — || align=right | 1.3 km || 
|-id=343 bgcolor=#E9E9E9
| 458343 ||  || — || November 19, 2006 || Kitt Peak || Spacewatch || — || align=right data-sort-value="0.97" | 970 m || 
|-id=344 bgcolor=#E9E9E9
| 458344 ||  || — || October 6, 2005 || Mount Lemmon || Mount Lemmon Survey || — || align=right | 2.1 km || 
|-id=345 bgcolor=#d6d6d6
| 458345 ||  || — || May 7, 2007 || Kitt Peak || Spacewatch || — || align=right | 3.2 km || 
|-id=346 bgcolor=#E9E9E9
| 458346 ||  || — || November 10, 2010 || Mount Lemmon || Mount Lemmon Survey || — || align=right | 1.5 km || 
|-id=347 bgcolor=#E9E9E9
| 458347 ||  || — || September 11, 2010 || Mount Lemmon || Mount Lemmon Survey || GEF || align=right | 1.2 km || 
|-id=348 bgcolor=#E9E9E9
| 458348 ||  || — || October 31, 2010 || Mount Lemmon || Mount Lemmon Survey || — || align=right | 1.3 km || 
|-id=349 bgcolor=#E9E9E9
| 458349 ||  || — || November 2, 2010 || Kitt Peak || Spacewatch || — || align=right | 1.5 km || 
|-id=350 bgcolor=#E9E9E9
| 458350 ||  || — || November 1, 2010 || Kitt Peak || Spacewatch || — || align=right | 1.9 km || 
|-id=351 bgcolor=#E9E9E9
| 458351 ||  || — || December 21, 2006 || Kitt Peak || Spacewatch || — || align=right | 1.4 km || 
|-id=352 bgcolor=#E9E9E9
| 458352 ||  || — || October 13, 2010 || Mount Lemmon || Mount Lemmon Survey || — || align=right | 1.6 km || 
|-id=353 bgcolor=#E9E9E9
| 458353 ||  || — || November 9, 2001 || Socorro || LINEAR || — || align=right | 1.5 km || 
|-id=354 bgcolor=#E9E9E9
| 458354 ||  || — || March 11, 2008 || Mount Lemmon || Mount Lemmon Survey || — || align=right | 1.6 km || 
|-id=355 bgcolor=#E9E9E9
| 458355 ||  || — || August 28, 2005 || Kitt Peak || Spacewatch || — || align=right | 1.8 km || 
|-id=356 bgcolor=#d6d6d6
| 458356 ||  || — || September 3, 2010 || Mount Lemmon || Mount Lemmon Survey || — || align=right | 2.4 km || 
|-id=357 bgcolor=#E9E9E9
| 458357 ||  || — || November 1, 2010 || Kitt Peak || Spacewatch || — || align=right | 1.5 km || 
|-id=358 bgcolor=#E9E9E9
| 458358 ||  || — || September 18, 2010 || Mount Lemmon || Mount Lemmon Survey || — || align=right | 2.4 km || 
|-id=359 bgcolor=#E9E9E9
| 458359 ||  || — || November 21, 2006 || Mount Lemmon || Mount Lemmon Survey || JUN || align=right data-sort-value="0.93" | 930 m || 
|-id=360 bgcolor=#E9E9E9
| 458360 ||  || — || November 18, 2006 || Kitt Peak || Spacewatch || — || align=right | 1.4 km || 
|-id=361 bgcolor=#E9E9E9
| 458361 ||  || — || October 11, 2010 || Mount Lemmon || Mount Lemmon Survey || — || align=right | 1.3 km || 
|-id=362 bgcolor=#E9E9E9
| 458362 ||  || — || November 3, 2010 || Mount Lemmon || Mount Lemmon Survey || — || align=right | 1.3 km || 
|-id=363 bgcolor=#E9E9E9
| 458363 ||  || — || April 7, 2008 || Mount Lemmon || Mount Lemmon Survey || — || align=right | 1.5 km || 
|-id=364 bgcolor=#E9E9E9
| 458364 ||  || — || December 13, 2006 || Kitt Peak || Spacewatch || — || align=right | 1.5 km || 
|-id=365 bgcolor=#E9E9E9
| 458365 ||  || — || December 14, 2006 || Kitt Peak || Spacewatch || — || align=right | 1.1 km || 
|-id=366 bgcolor=#E9E9E9
| 458366 ||  || — || October 29, 2010 || Catalina || CSS || — || align=right | 1.8 km || 
|-id=367 bgcolor=#E9E9E9
| 458367 ||  || — || November 23, 2006 || Kitt Peak || Spacewatch || — || align=right | 1.4 km || 
|-id=368 bgcolor=#FFC2E0
| 458368 ||  || — || November 17, 2010 || Socorro || LINEAR || AMO || align=right data-sort-value="0.74" | 740 m || 
|-id=369 bgcolor=#E9E9E9
| 458369 ||  || — || March 28, 2008 || Kitt Peak || Spacewatch || — || align=right | 1.6 km || 
|-id=370 bgcolor=#E9E9E9
| 458370 ||  || — || September 5, 2010 || Mount Lemmon || Mount Lemmon Survey || MIS || align=right | 2.6 km || 
|-id=371 bgcolor=#E9E9E9
| 458371 ||  || — || November 14, 2010 || Kitt Peak || Spacewatch || — || align=right | 1.3 km || 
|-id=372 bgcolor=#E9E9E9
| 458372 ||  || — || December 21, 2006 || Kitt Peak || Spacewatch || — || align=right | 1.3 km || 
|-id=373 bgcolor=#E9E9E9
| 458373 ||  || — || November 13, 2010 || Kitt Peak || Spacewatch || — || align=right | 2.1 km || 
|-id=374 bgcolor=#E9E9E9
| 458374 ||  || — || January 9, 2002 || Socorro || LINEAR || — || align=right | 2.5 km || 
|-id=375 bgcolor=#FFC2E0
| 458375 ||  || — || April 27, 2003 || Apache Point || SDSS || AMOcritical || align=right data-sort-value="0.20" | 200 m || 
|-id=376 bgcolor=#E9E9E9
| 458376 ||  || — || November 27, 2010 || Mount Lemmon || Mount Lemmon Survey || — || align=right | 1.8 km || 
|-id=377 bgcolor=#E9E9E9
| 458377 ||  || — || November 6, 2010 || Catalina || CSS || — || align=right | 1.9 km || 
|-id=378 bgcolor=#E9E9E9
| 458378 ||  || — || November 27, 2010 || Mount Lemmon || Mount Lemmon Survey || (5) || align=right data-sort-value="0.78" | 780 m || 
|-id=379 bgcolor=#E9E9E9
| 458379 ||  || — || November 11, 2010 || Mount Lemmon || Mount Lemmon Survey || — || align=right | 2.3 km || 
|-id=380 bgcolor=#d6d6d6
| 458380 ||  || — || November 27, 2010 || Mount Lemmon || Mount Lemmon Survey || — || align=right | 2.3 km || 
|-id=381 bgcolor=#d6d6d6
| 458381 ||  || — || April 20, 2007 || Kitt Peak || Spacewatch || — || align=right | 3.3 km || 
|-id=382 bgcolor=#E9E9E9
| 458382 ||  || — || November 19, 2006 || Kitt Peak || Spacewatch || — || align=right | 1.3 km || 
|-id=383 bgcolor=#E9E9E9
| 458383 ||  || — || November 10, 2010 || Kitt Peak || Spacewatch || — || align=right | 2.1 km || 
|-id=384 bgcolor=#E9E9E9
| 458384 ||  || — || November 3, 2010 || Kitt Peak || Spacewatch || — || align=right | 1.6 km || 
|-id=385 bgcolor=#E9E9E9
| 458385 ||  || — || September 29, 2005 || Kitt Peak || Spacewatch || — || align=right | 1.7 km || 
|-id=386 bgcolor=#E9E9E9
| 458386 ||  || — || November 30, 2010 || Mount Lemmon || Mount Lemmon Survey || EUN || align=right | 1.1 km || 
|-id=387 bgcolor=#E9E9E9
| 458387 ||  || — || November 6, 1996 || Kitt Peak || Spacewatch || — || align=right | 1.9 km || 
|-id=388 bgcolor=#E9E9E9
| 458388 ||  || — || September 26, 2005 || Kitt Peak || Spacewatch || — || align=right | 1.3 km || 
|-id=389 bgcolor=#d6d6d6
| 458389 ||  || — || December 30, 2005 || Kitt Peak || Spacewatch || EOS || align=right | 1.5 km || 
|-id=390 bgcolor=#d6d6d6
| 458390 ||  || — || April 15, 2008 || Mount Lemmon || Mount Lemmon Survey || — || align=right | 2.5 km || 
|-id=391 bgcolor=#E9E9E9
| 458391 ||  || — || October 9, 2005 || Kitt Peak || Spacewatch || — || align=right | 2.2 km || 
|-id=392 bgcolor=#E9E9E9
| 458392 ||  || — || December 1, 2010 || Kitt Peak || Spacewatch || — || align=right | 2.6 km || 
|-id=393 bgcolor=#E9E9E9
| 458393 ||  || — || November 12, 2005 || Kitt Peak || Spacewatch || — || align=right | 1.8 km || 
|-id=394 bgcolor=#d6d6d6
| 458394 ||  || — || December 1, 2010 || Kitt Peak || Spacewatch || — || align=right | 3.0 km || 
|-id=395 bgcolor=#E9E9E9
| 458395 ||  || — || June 18, 2005 || Mount Lemmon || Mount Lemmon Survey || — || align=right | 1.5 km || 
|-id=396 bgcolor=#E9E9E9
| 458396 ||  || — || December 4, 2010 || Mount Lemmon || Mount Lemmon Survey || — || align=right | 2.3 km || 
|-id=397 bgcolor=#d6d6d6
| 458397 ||  || — || November 3, 2010 || Mount Lemmon || Mount Lemmon Survey || — || align=right | 4.7 km || 
|-id=398 bgcolor=#E9E9E9
| 458398 ||  || — || December 14, 2001 || Socorro || LINEAR || — || align=right | 2.1 km || 
|-id=399 bgcolor=#fefefe
| 458399 ||  || — || February 10, 2008 || Kitt Peak || Spacewatch || (2076) || align=right data-sort-value="0.66" | 660 m || 
|-id=400 bgcolor=#E9E9E9
| 458400 ||  || — || November 15, 2010 || Catalina || CSS || — || align=right | 1.1 km || 
|}

458401–458500 

|-bgcolor=#fefefe
| 458401 ||  || — || January 7, 2006 || Catalina || CSS || H || align=right data-sort-value="0.93" | 930 m || 
|-id=402 bgcolor=#d6d6d6
| 458402 ||  || — || May 27, 2008 || Mount Lemmon || Mount Lemmon Survey || — || align=right | 2.5 km || 
|-id=403 bgcolor=#d6d6d6
| 458403 ||  || — || December 6, 2010 || Mount Lemmon || Mount Lemmon Survey || — || align=right | 2.4 km || 
|-id=404 bgcolor=#d6d6d6
| 458404 ||  || — || January 2, 2006 || Mount Lemmon || Mount Lemmon Survey || — || align=right | 2.6 km || 
|-id=405 bgcolor=#fefefe
| 458405 ||  || — || December 10, 2010 || Mount Lemmon || Mount Lemmon Survey || H || align=right data-sort-value="0.47" | 470 m || 
|-id=406 bgcolor=#E9E9E9
| 458406 ||  || — || April 30, 2008 || Mount Lemmon || Mount Lemmon Survey || — || align=right | 1.1 km || 
|-id=407 bgcolor=#E9E9E9
| 458407 ||  || — || December 12, 2006 || Socorro || LINEAR || — || align=right | 2.3 km || 
|-id=408 bgcolor=#E9E9E9
| 458408 ||  || — || November 28, 2010 || Kitt Peak || Spacewatch || EUN || align=right | 1.2 km || 
|-id=409 bgcolor=#E9E9E9
| 458409 ||  || — || February 10, 2002 || Socorro || LINEAR || — || align=right | 2.0 km || 
|-id=410 bgcolor=#d6d6d6
| 458410 ||  || — || January 23, 2006 || Kitt Peak || Spacewatch || critical || align=right | 1.8 km || 
|-id=411 bgcolor=#d6d6d6
| 458411 ||  || — || January 23, 2006 || Kitt Peak || Spacewatch || — || align=right | 1.9 km || 
|-id=412 bgcolor=#E9E9E9
| 458412 ||  || — || January 27, 2007 || Mount Lemmon || Mount Lemmon Survey || — || align=right | 2.4 km || 
|-id=413 bgcolor=#d6d6d6
| 458413 ||  || — || September 19, 2009 || Mount Lemmon || Mount Lemmon Survey || THM || align=right | 1.9 km || 
|-id=414 bgcolor=#d6d6d6
| 458414 ||  || — || December 25, 2005 || Kitt Peak || Spacewatch || — || align=right | 3.2 km || 
|-id=415 bgcolor=#d6d6d6
| 458415 ||  || — || November 16, 2010 || Mount Lemmon || Mount Lemmon Survey || EOS || align=right | 1.9 km || 
|-id=416 bgcolor=#E9E9E9
| 458416 ||  || — || December 6, 2010 || Mount Lemmon || Mount Lemmon Survey || — || align=right | 2.7 km || 
|-id=417 bgcolor=#d6d6d6
| 458417 ||  || — || December 10, 2010 || Mount Lemmon || Mount Lemmon Survey || — || align=right | 3.0 km || 
|-id=418 bgcolor=#FFC2E0
| 458418 ||  || — || January 8, 2011 || Siding Spring || SSS || APOPHAcritical || align=right data-sort-value="0.45" | 450 m || 
|-id=419 bgcolor=#d6d6d6
| 458419 ||  || — || December 6, 2010 || Mount Lemmon || Mount Lemmon Survey || EOS || align=right | 2.0 km || 
|-id=420 bgcolor=#d6d6d6
| 458420 ||  || — || November 15, 2010 || Mount Lemmon || Mount Lemmon Survey || — || align=right | 2.7 km || 
|-id=421 bgcolor=#E9E9E9
| 458421 ||  || — || January 9, 2011 || Mount Lemmon || Mount Lemmon Survey || — || align=right | 2.4 km || 
|-id=422 bgcolor=#E9E9E9
| 458422 ||  || — || January 8, 2011 || Mount Lemmon || Mount Lemmon Survey || — || align=right | 2.0 km || 
|-id=423 bgcolor=#d6d6d6
| 458423 ||  || — || December 25, 2010 || Mount Lemmon || Mount Lemmon Survey || — || align=right | 2.8 km || 
|-id=424 bgcolor=#d6d6d6
| 458424 ||  || — || January 16, 2000 || Kitt Peak || Spacewatch || — || align=right | 2.8 km || 
|-id=425 bgcolor=#E9E9E9
| 458425 ||  || — || August 27, 2009 || Kitt Peak || Spacewatch || MRX || align=right data-sort-value="0.85" | 850 m || 
|-id=426 bgcolor=#d6d6d6
| 458426 ||  || — || October 18, 2009 || Kitt Peak || Spacewatch || — || align=right | 4.0 km || 
|-id=427 bgcolor=#d6d6d6
| 458427 ||  || — || January 12, 2011 || Kitt Peak || Spacewatch || EOS || align=right | 1.7 km || 
|-id=428 bgcolor=#fefefe
| 458428 ||  || — || December 13, 2010 || Catalina || CSS || H || align=right data-sort-value="0.91" | 910 m || 
|-id=429 bgcolor=#d6d6d6
| 458429 ||  || — || December 4, 2005 || Kitt Peak || Spacewatch || — || align=right | 2.0 km || 
|-id=430 bgcolor=#d6d6d6
| 458430 ||  || — || January 10, 2011 || Mount Lemmon || Mount Lemmon Survey || — || align=right | 2.4 km || 
|-id=431 bgcolor=#E9E9E9
| 458431 ||  || — || March 11, 2007 || Kitt Peak || Spacewatch || — || align=right | 2.0 km || 
|-id=432 bgcolor=#fefefe
| 458432 ||  || — || September 12, 2004 || Socorro || LINEAR || H || align=right data-sort-value="0.80" | 800 m || 
|-id=433 bgcolor=#d6d6d6
| 458433 ||  || — || December 31, 2000 || Kitt Peak || Spacewatch || — || align=right | 1.7 km || 
|-id=434 bgcolor=#d6d6d6
| 458434 ||  || — || December 10, 2010 || Mount Lemmon || Mount Lemmon Survey || — || align=right | 2.7 km || 
|-id=435 bgcolor=#d6d6d6
| 458435 ||  || — || January 11, 2011 || Mount Lemmon || Mount Lemmon Survey || — || align=right | 2.6 km || 
|-id=436 bgcolor=#FFC2E0
| 458436 ||  || — || January 14, 2011 || Mount Lemmon || Mount Lemmon Survey || AMO +1kmPHAcritical || align=right | 1.1 km || 
|-id=437 bgcolor=#d6d6d6
| 458437 ||  || — || January 6, 2000 || Kitt Peak || Spacewatch || — || align=right | 2.1 km || 
|-id=438 bgcolor=#d6d6d6
| 458438 ||  || — || December 8, 2010 || Mount Lemmon || Mount Lemmon Survey || — || align=right | 3.1 km || 
|-id=439 bgcolor=#d6d6d6
| 458439 ||  || — || January 10, 2011 || Kitt Peak || Spacewatch || — || align=right | 3.0 km || 
|-id=440 bgcolor=#d6d6d6
| 458440 ||  || — || January 11, 2011 || Mount Lemmon || Mount Lemmon Survey || EOS || align=right | 1.7 km || 
|-id=441 bgcolor=#d6d6d6
| 458441 ||  || — || January 23, 2006 || Kitt Peak || Spacewatch || — || align=right | 2.2 km || 
|-id=442 bgcolor=#E9E9E9
| 458442 ||  || — || December 6, 2010 || Mount Lemmon || Mount Lemmon Survey || — || align=right | 2.3 km || 
|-id=443 bgcolor=#d6d6d6
| 458443 ||  || — || January 23, 2006 || Kitt Peak || Spacewatch || — || align=right | 1.8 km || 
|-id=444 bgcolor=#d6d6d6
| 458444 ||  || — || January 14, 2011 || Mount Lemmon || Mount Lemmon Survey || — || align=right | 2.3 km || 
|-id=445 bgcolor=#d6d6d6
| 458445 ||  || — || December 5, 2010 || Mount Lemmon || Mount Lemmon Survey || — || align=right | 2.9 km || 
|-id=446 bgcolor=#d6d6d6
| 458446 ||  || — || January 30, 2006 || Kitt Peak || Spacewatch || EOS || align=right | 1.8 km || 
|-id=447 bgcolor=#d6d6d6
| 458447 ||  || — || December 5, 2010 || Mount Lemmon || Mount Lemmon Survey || — || align=right | 2.5 km || 
|-id=448 bgcolor=#E9E9E9
| 458448 ||  || — || December 5, 2010 || Mount Lemmon || Mount Lemmon Survey || — || align=right | 2.3 km || 
|-id=449 bgcolor=#d6d6d6
| 458449 ||  || — || December 13, 2010 || Mount Lemmon || Mount Lemmon Survey || — || align=right | 3.7 km || 
|-id=450 bgcolor=#d6d6d6
| 458450 ||  || — || December 25, 2005 || Kitt Peak || Spacewatch || — || align=right | 2.1 km || 
|-id=451 bgcolor=#d6d6d6
| 458451 ||  || — || January 22, 2006 || Mount Lemmon || Mount Lemmon Survey || TEL || align=right | 1.5 km || 
|-id=452 bgcolor=#FFC2E0
| 458452 ||  || — || January 25, 2011 || Siding Spring || SSS || ATE || align=right data-sort-value="0.38" | 380 m || 
|-id=453 bgcolor=#fefefe
| 458453 ||  || — || December 25, 2005 || Mount Lemmon || Mount Lemmon Survey || H || align=right data-sort-value="0.64" | 640 m || 
|-id=454 bgcolor=#d6d6d6
| 458454 ||  || — || September 6, 2008 || Mount Lemmon || Mount Lemmon Survey || — || align=right | 3.2 km || 
|-id=455 bgcolor=#d6d6d6
| 458455 ||  || — || November 16, 2009 || Mount Lemmon || Mount Lemmon Survey || — || align=right | 2.5 km || 
|-id=456 bgcolor=#E9E9E9
| 458456 ||  || — || September 22, 2009 || Kitt Peak || Spacewatch || AST || align=right | 1.6 km || 
|-id=457 bgcolor=#d6d6d6
| 458457 ||  || — || March 4, 2006 || Mount Lemmon || Mount Lemmon Survey || THM || align=right | 2.0 km || 
|-id=458 bgcolor=#d6d6d6
| 458458 ||  || — || April 20, 2007 || Mount Lemmon || Mount Lemmon Survey || — || align=right | 2.9 km || 
|-id=459 bgcolor=#d6d6d6
| 458459 ||  || — || September 20, 2003 || Kitt Peak || Spacewatch || — || align=right | 3.1 km || 
|-id=460 bgcolor=#d6d6d6
| 458460 ||  || — || February 25, 2006 || Mount Lemmon || Mount Lemmon Survey || — || align=right | 2.9 km || 
|-id=461 bgcolor=#d6d6d6
| 458461 ||  || — || January 13, 2011 || Kitt Peak || Spacewatch || — || align=right | 3.0 km || 
|-id=462 bgcolor=#d6d6d6
| 458462 ||  || — || January 28, 2011 || Mount Lemmon || Mount Lemmon Survey || — || align=right | 2.4 km || 
|-id=463 bgcolor=#d6d6d6
| 458463 ||  || — || February 10, 2010 || WISE || WISE || — || align=right | 2.4 km || 
|-id=464 bgcolor=#E9E9E9
| 458464 ||  || — || April 25, 2003 || Kitt Peak || Spacewatch || — || align=right | 1.8 km || 
|-id=465 bgcolor=#d6d6d6
| 458465 ||  || — || December 12, 2004 || Kitt Peak || Spacewatch || — || align=right | 3.1 km || 
|-id=466 bgcolor=#d6d6d6
| 458466 ||  || — || January 13, 2011 || Mount Lemmon || Mount Lemmon Survey || — || align=right | 2.5 km || 
|-id=467 bgcolor=#E9E9E9
| 458467 ||  || — || January 4, 2011 || Mount Lemmon || Mount Lemmon Survey || HOF || align=right | 2.3 km || 
|-id=468 bgcolor=#d6d6d6
| 458468 ||  || — || December 8, 2010 || Mount Lemmon || Mount Lemmon Survey || EMA || align=right | 3.3 km || 
|-id=469 bgcolor=#d6d6d6
| 458469 ||  || — || January 29, 2011 || Kitt Peak || Spacewatch || — || align=right | 2.5 km || 
|-id=470 bgcolor=#d6d6d6
| 458470 ||  || — || August 12, 2007 || Kitt Peak || Spacewatch || — || align=right | 3.1 km || 
|-id=471 bgcolor=#d6d6d6
| 458471 ||  || — || January 28, 2011 || Mount Lemmon || Mount Lemmon Survey || — || align=right | 2.3 km || 
|-id=472 bgcolor=#d6d6d6
| 458472 ||  || — || February 24, 2006 || Kitt Peak || Spacewatch || — || align=right | 2.0 km || 
|-id=473 bgcolor=#E9E9E9
| 458473 ||  || — || January 12, 2011 || Mount Lemmon || Mount Lemmon Survey || — || align=right | 2.0 km || 
|-id=474 bgcolor=#d6d6d6
| 458474 ||  || — || December 8, 2010 || Mount Lemmon || Mount Lemmon Survey || EOS || align=right | 1.7 km || 
|-id=475 bgcolor=#d6d6d6
| 458475 ||  || — || September 20, 2003 || Kitt Peak || Spacewatch || EOS || align=right | 3.3 km || 
|-id=476 bgcolor=#d6d6d6
| 458476 ||  || — || February 4, 2010 || WISE || WISE || — || align=right | 3.2 km || 
|-id=477 bgcolor=#d6d6d6
| 458477 ||  || — || January 14, 2011 || Kitt Peak || Spacewatch || — || align=right | 2.0 km || 
|-id=478 bgcolor=#d6d6d6
| 458478 ||  || — || January 31, 2006 || Kitt Peak || Spacewatch || — || align=right | 2.5 km || 
|-id=479 bgcolor=#d6d6d6
| 458479 ||  || — || October 16, 2009 || Catalina || CSS || — || align=right | 3.4 km || 
|-id=480 bgcolor=#d6d6d6
| 458480 ||  || — || February 27, 2006 || Kitt Peak || Spacewatch || — || align=right | 2.5 km || 
|-id=481 bgcolor=#d6d6d6
| 458481 ||  || — || January 27, 2010 || WISE || WISE || — || align=right | 2.3 km || 
|-id=482 bgcolor=#d6d6d6
| 458482 ||  || — || January 28, 2006 || Mount Lemmon || Mount Lemmon Survey || — || align=right | 2.3 km || 
|-id=483 bgcolor=#E9E9E9
| 458483 ||  || — || December 5, 2010 || Mount Lemmon || Mount Lemmon Survey || EUN || align=right | 1.5 km || 
|-id=484 bgcolor=#d6d6d6
| 458484 ||  || — || January 8, 2006 || Mount Lemmon || Mount Lemmon Survey || — || align=right | 1.7 km || 
|-id=485 bgcolor=#d6d6d6
| 458485 ||  || — || January 23, 2006 || Kitt Peak || Spacewatch || — || align=right | 2.8 km || 
|-id=486 bgcolor=#d6d6d6
| 458486 ||  || — || November 11, 2009 || Mount Lemmon || Mount Lemmon Survey || — || align=right | 3.6 km || 
|-id=487 bgcolor=#d6d6d6
| 458487 ||  || — || January 29, 2011 || Mount Lemmon || Mount Lemmon Survey || — || align=right | 2.1 km || 
|-id=488 bgcolor=#d6d6d6
| 458488 ||  || — || December 5, 2005 || Mount Lemmon || Mount Lemmon Survey || — || align=right | 2.1 km || 
|-id=489 bgcolor=#d6d6d6
| 458489 ||  || — || September 16, 2009 || Kitt Peak || Spacewatch || — || align=right | 1.8 km || 
|-id=490 bgcolor=#d6d6d6
| 458490 ||  || — || December 5, 2010 || Mount Lemmon || Mount Lemmon Survey || BRA || align=right | 1.3 km || 
|-id=491 bgcolor=#d6d6d6
| 458491 ||  || — || January 10, 2011 || Kitt Peak || Spacewatch || — || align=right | 3.4 km || 
|-id=492 bgcolor=#d6d6d6
| 458492 ||  || — || April 25, 2007 || Kitt Peak || Spacewatch || — || align=right | 2.6 km || 
|-id=493 bgcolor=#fefefe
| 458493 ||  || — || January 11, 2011 || Mount Lemmon || Mount Lemmon Survey || H || align=right data-sort-value="0.56" | 560 m || 
|-id=494 bgcolor=#d6d6d6
| 458494 ||  || — || January 23, 2006 || Kitt Peak || Spacewatch || — || align=right | 1.9 km || 
|-id=495 bgcolor=#E9E9E9
| 458495 ||  || — || March 14, 2002 || Anderson Mesa || LONEOS || — || align=right | 2.7 km || 
|-id=496 bgcolor=#d6d6d6
| 458496 ||  || — || January 14, 2011 || Kitt Peak || Spacewatch || — || align=right | 3.4 km || 
|-id=497 bgcolor=#d6d6d6
| 458497 ||  || — || October 22, 2009 || Mount Lemmon || Mount Lemmon Survey || KOR || align=right | 1.1 km || 
|-id=498 bgcolor=#fefefe
| 458498 ||  || — || January 7, 2006 || Mount Lemmon || Mount Lemmon Survey || H || align=right data-sort-value="0.53" | 530 m || 
|-id=499 bgcolor=#d6d6d6
| 458499 ||  || — || December 9, 2004 || Catalina || CSS || Tj (2.92) || align=right | 4.6 km || 
|-id=500 bgcolor=#d6d6d6
| 458500 ||  || — || January 14, 2010 || WISE || WISE || — || align=right | 2.5 km || 
|}

458501–458600 

|-bgcolor=#d6d6d6
| 458501 ||  || — || February 3, 2010 || WISE || WISE || — || align=right | 3.8 km || 
|-id=502 bgcolor=#d6d6d6
| 458502 ||  || — || January 24, 2006 || Anderson Mesa || LONEOS || — || align=right | 3.0 km || 
|-id=503 bgcolor=#d6d6d6
| 458503 ||  || — || December 3, 2010 || Mount Lemmon || Mount Lemmon Survey || — || align=right | 2.9 km || 
|-id=504 bgcolor=#d6d6d6
| 458504 ||  || — || January 22, 2006 || Mount Lemmon || Mount Lemmon Survey || — || align=right | 2.7 km || 
|-id=505 bgcolor=#E9E9E9
| 458505 ||  || — || February 10, 2002 || Socorro || LINEAR || — || align=right | 3.1 km || 
|-id=506 bgcolor=#d6d6d6
| 458506 ||  || — || March 24, 2006 || Kitt Peak || Spacewatch || — || align=right | 2.3 km || 
|-id=507 bgcolor=#d6d6d6
| 458507 ||  || — || January 15, 2011 || Mount Lemmon || Mount Lemmon Survey || — || align=right | 2.9 km || 
|-id=508 bgcolor=#d6d6d6
| 458508 ||  || — || September 11, 2007 || Mount Lemmon || Mount Lemmon Survey || Tj (2.99) || align=right | 4.4 km || 
|-id=509 bgcolor=#d6d6d6
| 458509 ||  || — || September 5, 2008 || Kitt Peak || Spacewatch || — || align=right | 2.3 km || 
|-id=510 bgcolor=#E9E9E9
| 458510 ||  || — || November 13, 2010 || Mount Lemmon || Mount Lemmon Survey || — || align=right | 2.4 km || 
|-id=511 bgcolor=#d6d6d6
| 458511 ||  || — || February 9, 2010 || WISE || WISE || — || align=right | 4.4 km || 
|-id=512 bgcolor=#d6d6d6
| 458512 ||  || — || April 29, 2000 || Anderson Mesa || LONEOS || Tj (2.99) || align=right | 5.3 km || 
|-id=513 bgcolor=#E9E9E9
| 458513 ||  || — || September 7, 2008 || Catalina || CSS || DOR || align=right | 2.4 km || 
|-id=514 bgcolor=#d6d6d6
| 458514 ||  || — || October 24, 2009 || Kitt Peak || Spacewatch || KOR || align=right | 1.1 km || 
|-id=515 bgcolor=#d6d6d6
| 458515 ||  || — || November 16, 2010 || Mount Lemmon || Mount Lemmon Survey || — || align=right | 2.5 km || 
|-id=516 bgcolor=#d6d6d6
| 458516 ||  || — || October 25, 2009 || Mount Lemmon || Mount Lemmon Survey || EOS || align=right | 2.1 km || 
|-id=517 bgcolor=#E9E9E9
| 458517 ||  || — || January 14, 2011 || Kitt Peak || Spacewatch || EUN || align=right | 1.2 km || 
|-id=518 bgcolor=#d6d6d6
| 458518 ||  || — || February 25, 2006 || Kitt Peak || Spacewatch || — || align=right | 2.4 km || 
|-id=519 bgcolor=#d6d6d6
| 458519 ||  || — || February 2, 2006 || Mount Lemmon || Mount Lemmon Survey || — || align=right | 2.9 km || 
|-id=520 bgcolor=#d6d6d6
| 458520 ||  || — || September 9, 2008 || Mount Lemmon || Mount Lemmon Survey || — || align=right | 2.9 km || 
|-id=521 bgcolor=#d6d6d6
| 458521 ||  || — || January 26, 2006 || Mount Lemmon || Mount Lemmon Survey || — || align=right | 3.2 km || 
|-id=522 bgcolor=#d6d6d6
| 458522 ||  || — || October 15, 2004 || Kitt Peak || Spacewatch || — || align=right | 2.4 km || 
|-id=523 bgcolor=#d6d6d6
| 458523 ||  || — || December 10, 2010 || Mount Lemmon || Mount Lemmon Survey || EOS || align=right | 2.1 km || 
|-id=524 bgcolor=#E9E9E9
| 458524 ||  || — || October 5, 2004 || Kitt Peak || Spacewatch || — || align=right | 1.8 km || 
|-id=525 bgcolor=#d6d6d6
| 458525 ||  || — || September 6, 2008 || Mount Lemmon || Mount Lemmon Survey || — || align=right | 2.0 km || 
|-id=526 bgcolor=#E9E9E9
| 458526 ||  || — || March 16, 2007 || Kitt Peak || Spacewatch || — || align=right | 1.9 km || 
|-id=527 bgcolor=#d6d6d6
| 458527 ||  || — || September 5, 2008 || Kitt Peak || Spacewatch || — || align=right | 2.9 km || 
|-id=528 bgcolor=#d6d6d6
| 458528 ||  || — || September 7, 1996 || Kitt Peak || Spacewatch || — || align=right | 2.9 km || 
|-id=529 bgcolor=#d6d6d6
| 458529 ||  || — || September 6, 2008 || Kitt Peak || Spacewatch || — || align=right | 3.2 km || 
|-id=530 bgcolor=#d6d6d6
| 458530 ||  || — || February 1, 2006 || Mount Lemmon || Mount Lemmon Survey || — || align=right | 2.2 km || 
|-id=531 bgcolor=#fefefe
| 458531 ||  || — || January 29, 2011 || Kitt Peak || Spacewatch || H || align=right data-sort-value="0.86" | 860 m || 
|-id=532 bgcolor=#d6d6d6
| 458532 ||  || — || February 23, 2011 || Kitt Peak || Spacewatch || — || align=right | 3.1 km || 
|-id=533 bgcolor=#d6d6d6
| 458533 ||  || — || February 14, 2005 || Kitt Peak || Spacewatch || THM || align=right | 1.8 km || 
|-id=534 bgcolor=#E9E9E9
| 458534 ||  || — || March 12, 2007 || Kitt Peak || Spacewatch || — || align=right | 1.8 km || 
|-id=535 bgcolor=#E9E9E9
| 458535 ||  || — || September 2, 2008 || Kitt Peak || Spacewatch || — || align=right | 3.0 km || 
|-id=536 bgcolor=#d6d6d6
| 458536 ||  || — || March 3, 2006 || Kitt Peak || Spacewatch || — || align=right | 2.2 km || 
|-id=537 bgcolor=#d6d6d6
| 458537 ||  || — || April 27, 2006 || Catalina || CSS || — || align=right | 2.9 km || 
|-id=538 bgcolor=#d6d6d6
| 458538 ||  || — || September 7, 2008 || Mount Lemmon || Mount Lemmon Survey || — || align=right | 3.4 km || 
|-id=539 bgcolor=#E9E9E9
| 458539 ||  || — || November 25, 2005 || Catalina || CSS || — || align=right | 2.7 km || 
|-id=540 bgcolor=#d6d6d6
| 458540 ||  || — || February 25, 2011 || Catalina || CSS || — || align=right | 3.8 km || 
|-id=541 bgcolor=#d6d6d6
| 458541 ||  || — || October 1, 2003 || Kitt Peak || Spacewatch || — || align=right | 2.9 km || 
|-id=542 bgcolor=#fefefe
| 458542 ||  || — || February 10, 2011 || Mount Lemmon || Mount Lemmon Survey || H || align=right data-sort-value="0.72" | 720 m || 
|-id=543 bgcolor=#fefefe
| 458543 ||  || — || January 10, 2011 || Mount Lemmon || Mount Lemmon Survey || H || align=right data-sort-value="0.67" | 670 m || 
|-id=544 bgcolor=#d6d6d6
| 458544 ||  || — || April 25, 2006 || Kitt Peak || Spacewatch || — || align=right | 2.8 km || 
|-id=545 bgcolor=#d6d6d6
| 458545 ||  || — || October 1, 2003 || Kitt Peak || Spacewatch || BRA || align=right | 1.4 km || 
|-id=546 bgcolor=#d6d6d6
| 458546 ||  || — || March 15, 2010 || WISE || WISE || — || align=right | 3.8 km || 
|-id=547 bgcolor=#d6d6d6
| 458547 ||  || — || February 22, 2011 || Kitt Peak || Spacewatch || THM || align=right | 2.3 km || 
|-id=548 bgcolor=#fefefe
| 458548 ||  || — || February 1, 2006 || Catalina || CSS || H || align=right data-sort-value="0.76" | 760 m || 
|-id=549 bgcolor=#d6d6d6
| 458549 ||  || — || March 23, 2006 || Catalina || CSS || — || align=right | 3.7 km || 
|-id=550 bgcolor=#d6d6d6
| 458550 ||  || — || January 14, 2011 || Mount Lemmon || Mount Lemmon Survey || — || align=right | 3.9 km || 
|-id=551 bgcolor=#d6d6d6
| 458551 ||  || — || April 2, 2006 || Kitt Peak || Spacewatch || — || align=right | 2.9 km || 
|-id=552 bgcolor=#d6d6d6
| 458552 ||  || — || September 28, 2008 || Mount Lemmon || Mount Lemmon Survey || — || align=right | 3.3 km || 
|-id=553 bgcolor=#d6d6d6
| 458553 ||  || — || March 29, 1995 || Kitt Peak || Spacewatch || — || align=right | 1.9 km || 
|-id=554 bgcolor=#FA8072
| 458554 ||  || — || March 4, 2011 || Mount Lemmon || Mount Lemmon Survey || H || align=right data-sort-value="0.64" | 640 m || 
|-id=555 bgcolor=#d6d6d6
| 458555 ||  || — || May 7, 2006 || Mount Lemmon || Mount Lemmon Survey || — || align=right | 2.5 km || 
|-id=556 bgcolor=#d6d6d6
| 458556 ||  || — || April 26, 2006 || Mount Lemmon || Mount Lemmon Survey || THM || align=right | 2.4 km || 
|-id=557 bgcolor=#d6d6d6
| 458557 ||  || — || February 9, 2010 || WISE || WISE || — || align=right | 3.1 km || 
|-id=558 bgcolor=#fefefe
| 458558 ||  || — || March 4, 2011 || Catalina || CSS || H || align=right data-sort-value="0.85" | 850 m || 
|-id=559 bgcolor=#d6d6d6
| 458559 ||  || — || January 30, 2011 || Kitt Peak || Spacewatch || — || align=right | 3.3 km || 
|-id=560 bgcolor=#d6d6d6
| 458560 ||  || — || January 30, 2011 || Kitt Peak || Spacewatch || — || align=right | 3.0 km || 
|-id=561 bgcolor=#d6d6d6
| 458561 ||  || — || October 23, 2008 || Kitt Peak || Spacewatch || — || align=right | 3.6 km || 
|-id=562 bgcolor=#d6d6d6
| 458562 ||  || — || March 4, 2005 || Mount Lemmon || Mount Lemmon Survey || — || align=right | 2.7 km || 
|-id=563 bgcolor=#d6d6d6
| 458563 ||  || — || September 25, 2008 || Mount Lemmon || Mount Lemmon Survey || EOS || align=right | 1.8 km || 
|-id=564 bgcolor=#d6d6d6
| 458564 ||  || — || March 12, 2011 || Mount Lemmon || Mount Lemmon Survey || EOS || align=right | 1.6 km || 
|-id=565 bgcolor=#d6d6d6
| 458565 ||  || — || October 8, 2008 || Catalina || CSS || EOS || align=right | 2.4 km || 
|-id=566 bgcolor=#d6d6d6
| 458566 ||  || — || May 23, 2006 || Kitt Peak || Spacewatch || — || align=right | 3.2 km || 
|-id=567 bgcolor=#d6d6d6
| 458567 ||  || — || March 12, 2011 || Mount Lemmon || Mount Lemmon Survey || EOS || align=right | 1.6 km || 
|-id=568 bgcolor=#d6d6d6
| 458568 ||  || — || March 10, 2011 || Kitt Peak || Spacewatch || — || align=right | 2.5 km || 
|-id=569 bgcolor=#d6d6d6
| 458569 ||  || — || April 24, 2006 || Kitt Peak || Spacewatch || — || align=right | 3.0 km || 
|-id=570 bgcolor=#d6d6d6
| 458570 ||  || — || March 16, 2010 || WISE || WISE || — || align=right | 2.5 km || 
|-id=571 bgcolor=#d6d6d6
| 458571 ||  || — || January 17, 2010 || WISE || WISE || — || align=right | 2.7 km || 
|-id=572 bgcolor=#d6d6d6
| 458572 ||  || — || March 2, 2011 || Kitt Peak || Spacewatch || — || align=right | 2.8 km || 
|-id=573 bgcolor=#d6d6d6
| 458573 ||  || — || May 2, 2006 || Mount Lemmon || Mount Lemmon Survey || THM || align=right | 1.7 km || 
|-id=574 bgcolor=#E9E9E9
| 458574 ||  || — || January 27, 2006 || Catalina || CSS || — || align=right | 2.7 km || 
|-id=575 bgcolor=#d6d6d6
| 458575 ||  || — || March 7, 2010 || WISE || WISE || — || align=right | 3.2 km || 
|-id=576 bgcolor=#d6d6d6
| 458576 ||  || — || February 26, 2011 || Kitt Peak || Spacewatch || — || align=right | 2.6 km || 
|-id=577 bgcolor=#d6d6d6
| 458577 ||  || — || September 23, 2008 || Kitt Peak || Spacewatch || — || align=right | 2.4 km || 
|-id=578 bgcolor=#d6d6d6
| 458578 ||  || — || March 24, 2011 || Catalina || CSS || — || align=right | 2.6 km || 
|-id=579 bgcolor=#d6d6d6
| 458579 ||  || — || January 29, 2011 || Kitt Peak || Spacewatch || — || align=right | 2.0 km || 
|-id=580 bgcolor=#d6d6d6
| 458580 ||  || — || March 24, 2011 || Catalina || CSS || — || align=right | 4.1 km || 
|-id=581 bgcolor=#d6d6d6
| 458581 ||  || — || March 26, 2011 || Kitt Peak || Spacewatch || THM || align=right | 2.4 km || 
|-id=582 bgcolor=#d6d6d6
| 458582 ||  || — || March 26, 2011 || Kitt Peak || Spacewatch || — || align=right | 3.4 km || 
|-id=583 bgcolor=#d6d6d6
| 458583 ||  || — || October 20, 2008 || Mount Lemmon || Mount Lemmon Survey || — || align=right | 2.9 km || 
|-id=584 bgcolor=#d6d6d6
| 458584 ||  || — || March 27, 2011 || Kitt Peak || Spacewatch || — || align=right | 2.8 km || 
|-id=585 bgcolor=#d6d6d6
| 458585 ||  || — || March 2, 2011 || Kitt Peak || Spacewatch || — || align=right | 2.4 km || 
|-id=586 bgcolor=#d6d6d6
| 458586 ||  || — || April 24, 2006 || Kitt Peak || Spacewatch || — || align=right | 2.1 km || 
|-id=587 bgcolor=#d6d6d6
| 458587 ||  || — || March 12, 2011 || Mount Lemmon || Mount Lemmon Survey || VER || align=right | 3.3 km || 
|-id=588 bgcolor=#fefefe
| 458588 ||  || — || March 10, 2011 || Kitt Peak || Spacewatch || H || align=right data-sort-value="0.70" | 700 m || 
|-id=589 bgcolor=#d6d6d6
| 458589 ||  || — || November 2, 2008 || Mount Lemmon || Mount Lemmon Survey || EOS || align=right | 2.0 km || 
|-id=590 bgcolor=#d6d6d6
| 458590 ||  || — || January 12, 2010 || Kitt Peak || Spacewatch || — || align=right | 2.7 km || 
|-id=591 bgcolor=#d6d6d6
| 458591 ||  || — || April 7, 2006 || Kitt Peak || Spacewatch || — || align=right | 2.3 km || 
|-id=592 bgcolor=#d6d6d6
| 458592 ||  || — || March 19, 2010 || WISE || WISE || — || align=right | 3.8 km || 
|-id=593 bgcolor=#d6d6d6
| 458593 ||  || — || March 29, 2011 || Kitt Peak || Spacewatch || — || align=right | 2.7 km || 
|-id=594 bgcolor=#d6d6d6
| 458594 ||  || — || April 2, 2006 || Kitt Peak || Spacewatch || — || align=right | 2.5 km || 
|-id=595 bgcolor=#d6d6d6
| 458595 ||  || — || December 11, 2004 || Kitt Peak || Spacewatch || — || align=right | 2.9 km || 
|-id=596 bgcolor=#d6d6d6
| 458596 ||  || — || September 23, 2008 || Kitt Peak || Spacewatch || — || align=right | 3.2 km || 
|-id=597 bgcolor=#d6d6d6
| 458597 ||  || — || February 5, 2011 || Mount Lemmon || Mount Lemmon Survey || LIX || align=right | 3.8 km || 
|-id=598 bgcolor=#d6d6d6
| 458598 ||  || — || March 9, 2011 || XuYi || PMO NEO || — || align=right | 3.3 km || 
|-id=599 bgcolor=#d6d6d6
| 458599 ||  || — || September 22, 2003 || Kitt Peak || Spacewatch || — || align=right | 3.5 km || 
|-id=600 bgcolor=#d6d6d6
| 458600 ||  || — || January 27, 2010 || WISE || WISE || — || align=right | 3.2 km || 
|}

458601–458700 

|-bgcolor=#d6d6d6
| 458601 ||  || — || May 1, 2006 || Kitt Peak || Spacewatch || — || align=right | 3.3 km || 
|-id=602 bgcolor=#d6d6d6
| 458602 ||  || — || October 27, 2008 || Mount Lemmon || Mount Lemmon Survey || — || align=right | 3.0 km || 
|-id=603 bgcolor=#d6d6d6
| 458603 ||  || — || September 22, 2008 || Kitt Peak || Spacewatch || — || align=right | 2.8 km || 
|-id=604 bgcolor=#d6d6d6
| 458604 ||  || — || March 29, 2011 || Kitt Peak || Spacewatch || — || align=right | 3.0 km || 
|-id=605 bgcolor=#d6d6d6
| 458605 ||  || — || March 3, 2005 || Kitt Peak || Spacewatch || THM || align=right | 2.3 km || 
|-id=606 bgcolor=#d6d6d6
| 458606 ||  || — || March 11, 2005 || Mount Lemmon || Mount Lemmon Survey || — || align=right | 2.9 km || 
|-id=607 bgcolor=#d6d6d6
| 458607 ||  || — || April 30, 2006 || Kitt Peak || Spacewatch || — || align=right | 1.8 km || 
|-id=608 bgcolor=#d6d6d6
| 458608 ||  || — || October 10, 2008 || Kitt Peak || Spacewatch || — || align=right | 2.7 km || 
|-id=609 bgcolor=#d6d6d6
| 458609 ||  || — || October 10, 2008 || Mount Lemmon || Mount Lemmon Survey || BRA || align=right | 1.4 km || 
|-id=610 bgcolor=#d6d6d6
| 458610 ||  || — || September 24, 2008 || Kitt Peak || Spacewatch || — || align=right | 2.9 km || 
|-id=611 bgcolor=#d6d6d6
| 458611 ||  || — || March 26, 2006 || Mount Lemmon || Mount Lemmon Survey || KOR || align=right | 1.4 km || 
|-id=612 bgcolor=#d6d6d6
| 458612 ||  || — || March 14, 2011 || Mount Lemmon || Mount Lemmon Survey || — || align=right | 2.3 km || 
|-id=613 bgcolor=#d6d6d6
| 458613 ||  || — || February 25, 2010 || WISE || WISE || — || align=right | 3.1 km || 
|-id=614 bgcolor=#d6d6d6
| 458614 ||  || — || November 9, 2009 || Kitt Peak || Spacewatch || — || align=right | 3.6 km || 
|-id=615 bgcolor=#d6d6d6
| 458615 ||  || — || September 19, 2009 || Mount Lemmon || Mount Lemmon Survey || LIX || align=right | 3.2 km || 
|-id=616 bgcolor=#d6d6d6
| 458616 ||  || — || March 6, 2010 || WISE || WISE || — || align=right | 3.7 km || 
|-id=617 bgcolor=#d6d6d6
| 458617 ||  || — || February 23, 2011 || Kitt Peak || Spacewatch || — || align=right | 2.5 km || 
|-id=618 bgcolor=#d6d6d6
| 458618 ||  || — || September 16, 2009 || Mount Lemmon || Mount Lemmon Survey || — || align=right | 2.0 km || 
|-id=619 bgcolor=#d6d6d6
| 458619 ||  || — || September 14, 2007 || Catalina || CSS || — || align=right | 3.4 km || 
|-id=620 bgcolor=#d6d6d6
| 458620 ||  || — || March 11, 2011 || Catalina || CSS || EOS || align=right | 2.1 km || 
|-id=621 bgcolor=#d6d6d6
| 458621 ||  || — || May 25, 2006 || Kitt Peak || Spacewatch || — || align=right | 2.8 km || 
|-id=622 bgcolor=#d6d6d6
| 458622 ||  || — || February 17, 2010 || WISE || WISE || — || align=right | 3.6 km || 
|-id=623 bgcolor=#d6d6d6
| 458623 ||  || — || March 4, 2006 || Kitt Peak || Spacewatch || — || align=right | 2.1 km || 
|-id=624 bgcolor=#d6d6d6
| 458624 ||  || — || February 8, 2011 || Mount Lemmon || Mount Lemmon Survey || — || align=right | 2.9 km || 
|-id=625 bgcolor=#d6d6d6
| 458625 ||  || — || March 25, 2011 || Catalina || CSS || — || align=right | 4.3 km || 
|-id=626 bgcolor=#d6d6d6
| 458626 ||  || — || September 3, 2008 || Kitt Peak || Spacewatch || EOS || align=right | 1.5 km || 
|-id=627 bgcolor=#d6d6d6
| 458627 ||  || — || September 23, 2008 || Kitt Peak || Spacewatch || EOS || align=right | 1.5 km || 
|-id=628 bgcolor=#d6d6d6
| 458628 ||  || — || October 18, 2003 || Kitt Peak || Spacewatch || — || align=right | 2.1 km || 
|-id=629 bgcolor=#d6d6d6
| 458629 ||  || — || March 8, 2000 || Socorro || LINEAR || — || align=right | 2.8 km || 
|-id=630 bgcolor=#d6d6d6
| 458630 ||  || — || September 25, 2008 || Kitt Peak || Spacewatch || — || align=right | 5.8 km || 
|-id=631 bgcolor=#d6d6d6
| 458631 ||  || — || March 29, 2000 || Kitt Peak || Spacewatch || — || align=right | 2.4 km || 
|-id=632 bgcolor=#d6d6d6
| 458632 ||  || — || January 16, 2005 || Catalina || CSS || — || align=right | 2.9 km || 
|-id=633 bgcolor=#d6d6d6
| 458633 ||  || — || February 2, 2005 || Socorro || LINEAR || TIR || align=right | 3.5 km || 
|-id=634 bgcolor=#d6d6d6
| 458634 ||  || — || December 27, 2009 || Kitt Peak || Spacewatch || — || align=right | 3.7 km || 
|-id=635 bgcolor=#fefefe
| 458635 ||  || — || March 29, 2011 || Kitt Peak || Spacewatch || H || align=right data-sort-value="0.65" | 650 m || 
|-id=636 bgcolor=#fefefe
| 458636 ||  || — || March 28, 2011 || Catalina || CSS || H || align=right data-sort-value="0.72" | 720 m || 
|-id=637 bgcolor=#d6d6d6
| 458637 ||  || — || April 26, 2006 || Siding Spring || SSS || — || align=right | 3.5 km || 
|-id=638 bgcolor=#d6d6d6
| 458638 ||  || — || February 1, 2005 || Kitt Peak || Spacewatch || — || align=right | 3.3 km || 
|-id=639 bgcolor=#d6d6d6
| 458639 ||  || — || April 2, 2011 || Kitt Peak || Spacewatch || — || align=right | 3.2 km || 
|-id=640 bgcolor=#d6d6d6
| 458640 ||  || — || February 29, 2000 || Socorro || LINEAR || — || align=right | 2.8 km || 
|-id=641 bgcolor=#d6d6d6
| 458641 ||  || — || November 9, 2008 || Kitt Peak || Spacewatch || — || align=right | 3.0 km || 
|-id=642 bgcolor=#d6d6d6
| 458642 ||  || — || April 4, 2005 || Mount Lemmon || Mount Lemmon Survey || — || align=right | 2.6 km || 
|-id=643 bgcolor=#E9E9E9
| 458643 ||  || — || February 10, 2011 || Mount Lemmon || Mount Lemmon Survey || — || align=right | 2.3 km || 
|-id=644 bgcolor=#d6d6d6
| 458644 ||  || — || September 23, 2008 || Kitt Peak || Spacewatch || — || align=right | 3.0 km || 
|-id=645 bgcolor=#fefefe
| 458645 ||  || — || March 1, 2011 || Mount Lemmon || Mount Lemmon Survey || H || align=right data-sort-value="0.74" | 740 m || 
|-id=646 bgcolor=#d6d6d6
| 458646 ||  || — || May 24, 2006 || Kitt Peak || Spacewatch || — || align=right | 3.3 km || 
|-id=647 bgcolor=#d6d6d6
| 458647 ||  || — || January 15, 2005 || Kitt Peak || Spacewatch || — || align=right | 3.7 km || 
|-id=648 bgcolor=#d6d6d6
| 458648 ||  || — || May 2, 2006 || Kitt Peak || Spacewatch || — || align=right | 2.9 km || 
|-id=649 bgcolor=#d6d6d6
| 458649 ||  || — || March 27, 2011 || Mount Lemmon || Mount Lemmon Survey || — || align=right | 2.6 km || 
|-id=650 bgcolor=#d6d6d6
| 458650 ||  || — || March 31, 2010 || WISE || WISE || — || align=right | 3.5 km || 
|-id=651 bgcolor=#d6d6d6
| 458651 ||  || — || February 27, 2010 || WISE || WISE || — || align=right | 4.1 km || 
|-id=652 bgcolor=#d6d6d6
| 458652 ||  || — || March 1, 2005 || Kitt Peak || Spacewatch || — || align=right | 2.4 km || 
|-id=653 bgcolor=#d6d6d6
| 458653 ||  || — || March 10, 2005 || Catalina || CSS || — || align=right | 2.9 km || 
|-id=654 bgcolor=#d6d6d6
| 458654 ||  || — || May 20, 2006 || Kitt Peak || Spacewatch || — || align=right | 2.3 km || 
|-id=655 bgcolor=#d6d6d6
| 458655 ||  || — || October 27, 2009 || Kitt Peak || Spacewatch || Tj (2.99) || align=right | 2.9 km || 
|-id=656 bgcolor=#d6d6d6
| 458656 ||  || — || January 6, 2010 || Mount Lemmon || Mount Lemmon Survey || — || align=right | 3.1 km || 
|-id=657 bgcolor=#d6d6d6
| 458657 ||  || — || March 27, 2010 || WISE || WISE || Tj (2.96) || align=right | 3.6 km || 
|-id=658 bgcolor=#d6d6d6
| 458658 ||  || — || November 20, 2009 || Catalina || CSS || Tj (2.96) || align=right | 4.1 km || 
|-id=659 bgcolor=#d6d6d6
| 458659 ||  || — || May 20, 2006 || Kitt Peak || Spacewatch || — || align=right | 2.0 km || 
|-id=660 bgcolor=#d6d6d6
| 458660 ||  || — || March 26, 2011 || Mount Lemmon || Mount Lemmon Survey || EOS || align=right | 2.3 km || 
|-id=661 bgcolor=#d6d6d6
| 458661 ||  || — || March 26, 2011 || Mount Lemmon || Mount Lemmon Survey || — || align=right | 3.0 km || 
|-id=662 bgcolor=#d6d6d6
| 458662 ||  || — || May 29, 2000 || Anderson Mesa || LONEOS || Tj (2.96) || align=right | 4.5 km || 
|-id=663 bgcolor=#d6d6d6
| 458663 ||  || — || April 1, 2011 || Mount Lemmon || Mount Lemmon Survey || — || align=right | 2.7 km || 
|-id=664 bgcolor=#d6d6d6
| 458664 ||  || — || February 9, 2010 || Mount Lemmon || Mount Lemmon Survey || THM || align=right | 2.0 km || 
|-id=665 bgcolor=#d6d6d6
| 458665 ||  || — || January 12, 2010 || Mount Lemmon || Mount Lemmon Survey || — || align=right | 2.6 km || 
|-id=666 bgcolor=#d6d6d6
| 458666 ||  || — || October 27, 2008 || Mount Lemmon || Mount Lemmon Survey || VER || align=right | 3.5 km || 
|-id=667 bgcolor=#d6d6d6
| 458667 ||  || — || February 9, 2005 || Mount Lemmon || Mount Lemmon Survey || THM || align=right | 2.2 km || 
|-id=668 bgcolor=#d6d6d6
| 458668 ||  || — || January 28, 2011 || Mount Lemmon || Mount Lemmon Survey || — || align=right | 3.1 km || 
|-id=669 bgcolor=#d6d6d6
| 458669 ||  || — || February 25, 2011 || Kitt Peak || Spacewatch || — || align=right | 2.9 km || 
|-id=670 bgcolor=#d6d6d6
| 458670 ||  || — || January 8, 2011 || Mount Lemmon || Mount Lemmon Survey || — || align=right | 3.0 km || 
|-id=671 bgcolor=#d6d6d6
| 458671 ||  || — || November 7, 2008 || Mount Lemmon || Mount Lemmon Survey || — || align=right | 3.1 km || 
|-id=672 bgcolor=#d6d6d6
| 458672 ||  || — || April 13, 2010 || WISE || WISE || EOS || align=right | 3.1 km || 
|-id=673 bgcolor=#d6d6d6
| 458673 ||  || — || March 27, 2011 || Mount Lemmon || Mount Lemmon Survey || — || align=right | 3.5 km || 
|-id=674 bgcolor=#d6d6d6
| 458674 ||  || — || February 5, 2010 || Catalina || CSS || — || align=right | 3.5 km || 
|-id=675 bgcolor=#d6d6d6
| 458675 ||  || — || November 19, 2009 || Kitt Peak || Spacewatch || — || align=right | 3.0 km || 
|-id=676 bgcolor=#d6d6d6
| 458676 ||  || — || April 6, 2011 || Mount Lemmon || Mount Lemmon Survey || — || align=right | 2.5 km || 
|-id=677 bgcolor=#d6d6d6
| 458677 ||  || — || October 26, 2008 || Kitt Peak || Spacewatch || — || align=right | 3.2 km || 
|-id=678 bgcolor=#d6d6d6
| 458678 ||  || — || March 26, 2011 || Kitt Peak || Spacewatch || — || align=right | 2.9 km || 
|-id=679 bgcolor=#d6d6d6
| 458679 ||  || — || November 7, 2008 || Mount Lemmon || Mount Lemmon Survey || — || align=right | 3.1 km || 
|-id=680 bgcolor=#d6d6d6
| 458680 ||  || — || February 5, 2011 || Mount Lemmon || Mount Lemmon Survey || EOS || align=right | 2.2 km || 
|-id=681 bgcolor=#d6d6d6
| 458681 ||  || — || January 12, 2010 || Kitt Peak || Spacewatch || LIX || align=right | 3.3 km || 
|-id=682 bgcolor=#d6d6d6
| 458682 ||  || — || March 1, 2005 || Kitt Peak || Spacewatch || — || align=right | 2.8 km || 
|-id=683 bgcolor=#d6d6d6
| 458683 ||  || — || October 27, 2009 || Mount Lemmon || Mount Lemmon Survey || — || align=right | 2.0 km || 
|-id=684 bgcolor=#d6d6d6
| 458684 ||  || — || April 26, 2010 || WISE || WISE || — || align=right | 3.7 km || 
|-id=685 bgcolor=#d6d6d6
| 458685 ||  || — || February 12, 2011 || Mount Lemmon || Mount Lemmon Survey || — || align=right | 3.3 km || 
|-id=686 bgcolor=#d6d6d6
| 458686 ||  || — || August 10, 2007 || Kitt Peak || Spacewatch || — || align=right | 2.6 km || 
|-id=687 bgcolor=#d6d6d6
| 458687 ||  || — || October 25, 2008 || Mount Lemmon || Mount Lemmon Survey || — || align=right | 2.8 km || 
|-id=688 bgcolor=#d6d6d6
| 458688 ||  || — || April 28, 2010 || WISE || WISE || — || align=right | 2.6 km || 
|-id=689 bgcolor=#d6d6d6
| 458689 ||  || — || September 10, 2007 || Kitt Peak || Spacewatch || — || align=right | 2.7 km || 
|-id=690 bgcolor=#d6d6d6
| 458690 ||  || — || November 19, 2008 || Kitt Peak || Spacewatch || — || align=right | 4.2 km || 
|-id=691 bgcolor=#d6d6d6
| 458691 ||  || — || April 24, 2011 || Kitt Peak || Spacewatch || — || align=right | 3.4 km || 
|-id=692 bgcolor=#d6d6d6
| 458692 ||  || — || February 15, 1994 || Kitt Peak || Spacewatch || — || align=right | 2.5 km || 
|-id=693 bgcolor=#d6d6d6
| 458693 ||  || — || April 8, 2010 || WISE || WISE || — || align=right | 3.4 km || 
|-id=694 bgcolor=#d6d6d6
| 458694 ||  || — || November 7, 2008 || Mount Lemmon || Mount Lemmon Survey || — || align=right | 3.9 km || 
|-id=695 bgcolor=#d6d6d6
| 458695 ||  || — || April 14, 2011 || Mount Lemmon || Mount Lemmon Survey || — || align=right | 3.1 km || 
|-id=696 bgcolor=#d6d6d6
| 458696 ||  || — || March 26, 2011 || Kitt Peak || Spacewatch || — || align=right | 2.0 km || 
|-id=697 bgcolor=#d6d6d6
| 458697 ||  || — || March 3, 2005 || Catalina || CSS || LIX || align=right | 3.3 km || 
|-id=698 bgcolor=#d6d6d6
| 458698 ||  || — || March 4, 2005 || Kitt Peak || Spacewatch || HYG || align=right | 2.7 km || 
|-id=699 bgcolor=#d6d6d6
| 458699 ||  || — || March 8, 2011 || Kitt Peak || Spacewatch || — || align=right | 2.4 km || 
|-id=700 bgcolor=#d6d6d6
| 458700 ||  || — || April 23, 2011 || Kitt Peak || Spacewatch || — || align=right | 3.7 km || 
|}

458701–458800 

|-bgcolor=#d6d6d6
| 458701 ||  || — || November 19, 2008 || Mount Lemmon || Mount Lemmon Survey || — || align=right | 2.8 km || 
|-id=702 bgcolor=#d6d6d6
| 458702 ||  || — || April 5, 2000 || Socorro || LINEAR || — || align=right | 2.7 km || 
|-id=703 bgcolor=#d6d6d6
| 458703 ||  || — || May 10, 1997 || Kitt Peak || Spacewatch || 7:4 || align=right | 4.5 km || 
|-id=704 bgcolor=#d6d6d6
| 458704 ||  || — || March 9, 2010 || WISE || WISE || — || align=right | 3.4 km || 
|-id=705 bgcolor=#d6d6d6
| 458705 ||  || — || June 13, 1999 || Catalina || CSS || 7:4* || align=right | 3.4 km || 
|-id=706 bgcolor=#d6d6d6
| 458706 ||  || — || February 9, 2010 || Catalina || CSS || — || align=right | 4.3 km || 
|-id=707 bgcolor=#d6d6d6
| 458707 ||  || — || March 31, 2001 || Kitt Peak || Spacewatch || — || align=right | 3.7 km || 
|-id=708 bgcolor=#d6d6d6
| 458708 ||  || — || October 11, 2007 || Catalina || CSS || — || align=right | 3.4 km || 
|-id=709 bgcolor=#d6d6d6
| 458709 ||  || — || November 20, 2008 || Kitt Peak || Spacewatch || EOS || align=right | 1.8 km || 
|-id=710 bgcolor=#d6d6d6
| 458710 ||  || — || March 4, 2005 || Mount Lemmon || Mount Lemmon Survey || THM || align=right | 2.4 km || 
|-id=711 bgcolor=#d6d6d6
| 458711 ||  || — || April 12, 2011 || Catalina || CSS || — || align=right | 3.2 km || 
|-id=712 bgcolor=#d6d6d6
| 458712 ||  || — || January 16, 2005 || Kitt Peak || Spacewatch || — || align=right | 2.8 km || 
|-id=713 bgcolor=#d6d6d6
| 458713 ||  || — || November 19, 2009 || Mount Lemmon || Mount Lemmon Survey || — || align=right | 5.2 km || 
|-id=714 bgcolor=#fefefe
| 458714 ||  || — || April 3, 2011 || Mount Lemmon || Mount Lemmon Survey || H || align=right data-sort-value="0.86" | 860 m || 
|-id=715 bgcolor=#d6d6d6
| 458715 ||  || — || May 30, 2006 || Mount Lemmon || Mount Lemmon Survey || — || align=right | 3.3 km || 
|-id=716 bgcolor=#d6d6d6
| 458716 ||  || — || November 17, 2009 || Mount Lemmon || Mount Lemmon Survey || THB || align=right | 2.7 km || 
|-id=717 bgcolor=#d6d6d6
| 458717 ||  || — || April 28, 2011 || Kitt Peak || Spacewatch || — || align=right | 3.1 km || 
|-id=718 bgcolor=#d6d6d6
| 458718 ||  || — || April 28, 2011 || Kitt Peak || Spacewatch || — || align=right | 3.5 km || 
|-id=719 bgcolor=#d6d6d6
| 458719 ||  || — || June 5, 1995 || Kitt Peak || Spacewatch || EOS || align=right | 2.0 km || 
|-id=720 bgcolor=#fefefe
| 458720 ||  || — || January 30, 2008 || Kitt Peak || Spacewatch || H || align=right data-sort-value="0.64" | 640 m || 
|-id=721 bgcolor=#d6d6d6
| 458721 ||  || — || January 11, 2010 || Kitt Peak || Spacewatch || — || align=right | 3.3 km || 
|-id=722 bgcolor=#fefefe
| 458722 ||  || — || July 23, 2006 || Mount Lemmon || Mount Lemmon Survey || H || align=right data-sort-value="0.99" | 990 m || 
|-id=723 bgcolor=#FFC2E0
| 458723 ||  || — || May 22, 2011 || Mount Lemmon || Mount Lemmon Survey || APOPHA || align=right data-sort-value="0.45" | 450 m || 
|-id=724 bgcolor=#d6d6d6
| 458724 ||  || — || May 3, 2011 || Kitt Peak || Spacewatch || VER || align=right | 2.9 km || 
|-id=725 bgcolor=#fefefe
| 458725 ||  || — || May 27, 2011 || Kitt Peak || Spacewatch || H || align=right data-sort-value="0.75" | 750 m || 
|-id=726 bgcolor=#d6d6d6
| 458726 ||  || — || November 17, 2009 || Kitt Peak || Spacewatch || — || align=right | 4.0 km || 
|-id=727 bgcolor=#d6d6d6
| 458727 ||  || — || March 9, 2005 || Mount Lemmon || Mount Lemmon Survey || — || align=right | 2.4 km || 
|-id=728 bgcolor=#d6d6d6
| 458728 ||  || — || October 17, 2006 || Kitt Peak || Spacewatch || 7:4 || align=right | 3.9 km || 
|-id=729 bgcolor=#d6d6d6
| 458729 ||  || — || March 25, 2010 || Kitt Peak || Spacewatch || THB || align=right | 2.8 km || 
|-id=730 bgcolor=#C2FFFF
| 458730 ||  || — || June 9, 2011 || Mount Lemmon || Mount Lemmon Survey || L5 || align=right | 9.5 km || 
|-id=731 bgcolor=#d6d6d6
| 458731 ||  || — || May 31, 2010 || WISE || WISE || EOS || align=right | 2.0 km || 
|-id=732 bgcolor=#FFC2E0
| 458732 ||  || — || June 30, 2011 || Haleakala || Pan-STARRS || APO +1kmcritical || align=right data-sort-value="0.90" | 900 m || 
|-id=733 bgcolor=#fefefe
| 458733 ||  || — || July 1, 2011 || Kitt Peak || Spacewatch || H || align=right data-sort-value="0.76" | 760 m || 
|-id=734 bgcolor=#FA8072
| 458734 ||  || — || February 6, 2007 || Mount Lemmon || Mount Lemmon Survey || — || align=right data-sort-value="0.81" | 810 m || 
|-id=735 bgcolor=#C2FFFF
| 458735 ||  || — || July 2, 2011 || Kitt Peak || Spacewatch || L5 || align=right | 7.8 km || 
|-id=736 bgcolor=#fefefe
| 458736 ||  || — || June 11, 2011 || Mount Lemmon || Mount Lemmon Survey || — || align=right data-sort-value="0.78" | 780 m || 
|-id=737 bgcolor=#fefefe
| 458737 ||  || — || June 26, 2011 || Mount Lemmon || Mount Lemmon Survey || — || align=right data-sort-value="0.64" | 640 m || 
|-id=738 bgcolor=#fefefe
| 458738 ||  || — || July 19, 2004 || Anderson Mesa || LONEOS || — || align=right data-sort-value="0.65" | 650 m || 
|-id=739 bgcolor=#fefefe
| 458739 ||  || — || November 17, 2008 || Catalina || CSS || — || align=right data-sort-value="0.71" | 710 m || 
|-id=740 bgcolor=#fefefe
| 458740 ||  || — || October 28, 1994 || Kitt Peak || Spacewatch || — || align=right data-sort-value="0.87" | 870 m || 
|-id=741 bgcolor=#fefefe
| 458741 ||  || — || January 25, 2006 || Kitt Peak || Spacewatch || — || align=right data-sort-value="0.53" | 530 m || 
|-id=742 bgcolor=#fefefe
| 458742 ||  || — || February 25, 2006 || Kitt Peak || Spacewatch || V || align=right data-sort-value="0.59" | 590 m || 
|-id=743 bgcolor=#fefefe
| 458743 ||  || — || December 5, 2008 || Mount Lemmon || Mount Lemmon Survey || — || align=right data-sort-value="0.77" | 770 m || 
|-id=744 bgcolor=#fefefe
| 458744 ||  || — || October 17, 2001 || Kitt Peak || Spacewatch || — || align=right data-sort-value="0.70" | 700 m || 
|-id=745 bgcolor=#FFC2E0
| 458745 ||  || — || August 27, 2011 || Mayhill-ISON || ISON || AMO || align=right data-sort-value="0.71" | 710 m || 
|-id=746 bgcolor=#fefefe
| 458746 ||  || — || March 18, 2010 || Mount Lemmon || Mount Lemmon Survey || — || align=right data-sort-value="0.91" | 910 m || 
|-id=747 bgcolor=#C2FFFF
| 458747 ||  || — || June 22, 2010 || Mount Lemmon || Mount Lemmon Survey || L5 || align=right | 9.7 km || 
|-id=748 bgcolor=#fefefe
| 458748 ||  || — || January 31, 2006 || Kitt Peak || Spacewatch || — || align=right data-sort-value="0.78" | 780 m || 
|-id=749 bgcolor=#C2FFFF
| 458749 ||  || — || February 1, 2006 || Mount Lemmon || Mount Lemmon Survey || L5 || align=right | 9.5 km || 
|-id=750 bgcolor=#fefefe
| 458750 ||  || — || September 25, 2000 || Kitt Peak || Spacewatch || NYS || align=right data-sort-value="0.51" | 510 m || 
|-id=751 bgcolor=#fefefe
| 458751 ||  || — || November 21, 2008 || Kitt Peak || Spacewatch || — || align=right data-sort-value="0.55" | 550 m || 
|-id=752 bgcolor=#d6d6d6
| 458752 ||  || — || March 15, 2004 || Kitt Peak || Spacewatch || Tj (2.98) || align=right | 3.6 km || 
|-id=753 bgcolor=#fefefe
| 458753 ||  || — || October 9, 2004 || Kitt Peak || Spacewatch || — || align=right data-sort-value="0.45" | 450 m || 
|-id=754 bgcolor=#fefefe
| 458754 ||  || — || October 10, 2004 || Kitt Peak || Spacewatch || — || align=right data-sort-value="0.67" | 670 m || 
|-id=755 bgcolor=#fefefe
| 458755 ||  || — || November 23, 2008 || Kitt Peak || Spacewatch || — || align=right data-sort-value="0.73" | 730 m || 
|-id=756 bgcolor=#fefefe
| 458756 ||  || — || June 27, 2011 || Mount Lemmon || Mount Lemmon Survey || — || align=right data-sort-value="0.78" | 780 m || 
|-id=757 bgcolor=#fefefe
| 458757 ||  || — || September 7, 2011 || Kitt Peak || Spacewatch || — || align=right data-sort-value="0.62" | 620 m || 
|-id=758 bgcolor=#fefefe
| 458758 ||  || — || September 7, 2004 || Kitt Peak || Spacewatch || — || align=right data-sort-value="0.49" | 490 m || 
|-id=759 bgcolor=#fefefe
| 458759 ||  || — || December 4, 2008 || Mount Lemmon || Mount Lemmon Survey || — || align=right data-sort-value="0.59" | 590 m || 
|-id=760 bgcolor=#d6d6d6
| 458760 ||  || — || March 14, 2010 || WISE || WISE || — || align=right | 3.4 km || 
|-id=761 bgcolor=#fefefe
| 458761 ||  || — || December 30, 2008 || Kitt Peak || Spacewatch || — || align=right data-sort-value="0.51" | 510 m || 
|-id=762 bgcolor=#fefefe
| 458762 ||  || — || November 19, 2001 || Socorro || LINEAR || — || align=right data-sort-value="0.83" | 830 m || 
|-id=763 bgcolor=#fefefe
| 458763 ||  || — || February 24, 2006 || Kitt Peak || Spacewatch || — || align=right data-sort-value="0.66" | 660 m || 
|-id=764 bgcolor=#fefefe
| 458764 ||  || — || February 26, 2009 || Kitt Peak || Spacewatch || — || align=right data-sort-value="0.79" | 790 m || 
|-id=765 bgcolor=#fefefe
| 458765 ||  || — || November 20, 2001 || Socorro || LINEAR || — || align=right data-sort-value="0.52" | 520 m || 
|-id=766 bgcolor=#fefefe
| 458766 ||  || — || January 25, 2009 || Kitt Peak || Spacewatch || — || align=right data-sort-value="0.56" | 560 m || 
|-id=767 bgcolor=#fefefe
| 458767 ||  || — || September 23, 2011 || Mount Lemmon || Mount Lemmon Survey || MAS || align=right data-sort-value="0.63" | 630 m || 
|-id=768 bgcolor=#fefefe
| 458768 ||  || — || November 17, 2004 || Campo Imperatore || CINEOS || — || align=right data-sort-value="0.65" | 650 m || 
|-id=769 bgcolor=#fefefe
| 458769 ||  || — || August 7, 2004 || Campo Imperatore || CINEOS || — || align=right data-sort-value="0.68" | 680 m || 
|-id=770 bgcolor=#fefefe
| 458770 ||  || — || September 7, 2008 || Mount Lemmon || Mount Lemmon Survey || — || align=right | 1.8 km || 
|-id=771 bgcolor=#fefefe
| 458771 ||  || — || September 18, 2011 || Catalina || CSS || — || align=right data-sort-value="0.94" | 940 m || 
|-id=772 bgcolor=#fefefe
| 458772 ||  || — || September 8, 2011 || Kitt Peak || Spacewatch || — || align=right data-sort-value="0.64" | 640 m || 
|-id=773 bgcolor=#fefefe
| 458773 ||  || — || April 9, 2003 || Kitt Peak || Spacewatch || — || align=right data-sort-value="0.74" | 740 m || 
|-id=774 bgcolor=#fefefe
| 458774 ||  || — || March 2, 2006 || Kitt Peak || Spacewatch || V || align=right data-sort-value="0.69" | 690 m || 
|-id=775 bgcolor=#fefefe
| 458775 ||  || — || August 31, 2011 || Siding Spring || SSS || — || align=right data-sort-value="0.79" | 790 m || 
|-id=776 bgcolor=#fefefe
| 458776 ||  || — || February 3, 2009 || Kitt Peak || Spacewatch || — || align=right data-sort-value="0.83" | 830 m || 
|-id=777 bgcolor=#fefefe
| 458777 ||  || — || October 11, 1977 || Palomar || PLS || — || align=right data-sort-value="0.73" | 730 m || 
|-id=778 bgcolor=#fefefe
| 458778 ||  || — || September 23, 2011 || Kitt Peak || Spacewatch || — || align=right data-sort-value="0.57" | 570 m || 
|-id=779 bgcolor=#fefefe
| 458779 ||  || — || October 22, 2008 || Kitt Peak || Spacewatch || — || align=right data-sort-value="0.69" | 690 m || 
|-id=780 bgcolor=#fefefe
| 458780 ||  || — || October 10, 2004 || Socorro || LINEAR || — || align=right data-sort-value="0.71" | 710 m || 
|-id=781 bgcolor=#fefefe
| 458781 ||  || — || November 10, 2004 || Kitt Peak || Spacewatch || NYS || align=right data-sort-value="0.68" | 680 m || 
|-id=782 bgcolor=#fefefe
| 458782 ||  || — || October 9, 2004 || Kitt Peak || Spacewatch || — || align=right data-sort-value="0.84" | 840 m || 
|-id=783 bgcolor=#fefefe
| 458783 ||  || — || August 14, 2004 || Campo Imperatore || CINEOS || — || align=right data-sort-value="0.80" | 800 m || 
|-id=784 bgcolor=#fefefe
| 458784 ||  || — || December 30, 2008 || Mount Lemmon || Mount Lemmon Survey || — || align=right data-sort-value="0.62" | 620 m || 
|-id=785 bgcolor=#fefefe
| 458785 ||  || — || September 23, 2011 || Kitt Peak || Spacewatch || — || align=right data-sort-value="0.66" | 660 m || 
|-id=786 bgcolor=#fefefe
| 458786 ||  || — || February 27, 2009 || Kitt Peak || Spacewatch || — || align=right data-sort-value="0.76" | 760 m || 
|-id=787 bgcolor=#fefefe
| 458787 ||  || — || April 9, 2010 || Kitt Peak || Spacewatch || — || align=right data-sort-value="0.94" | 940 m || 
|-id=788 bgcolor=#fefefe
| 458788 ||  || — || October 6, 2000 || Anderson Mesa || LONEOS || MAS || align=right data-sort-value="0.78" | 780 m || 
|-id=789 bgcolor=#fefefe
| 458789 ||  || — || January 18, 2009 || Kitt Peak || Spacewatch || — || align=right data-sort-value="0.59" | 590 m || 
|-id=790 bgcolor=#fefefe
| 458790 ||  || — || September 11, 2007 || Mount Lemmon || Mount Lemmon Survey || NYS || align=right data-sort-value="0.63" | 630 m || 
|-id=791 bgcolor=#fefefe
| 458791 ||  || — || December 21, 2008 || Mount Lemmon || Mount Lemmon Survey || — || align=right data-sort-value="0.56" | 560 m || 
|-id=792 bgcolor=#fefefe
| 458792 ||  || — || February 25, 2006 || Kitt Peak || Spacewatch || — || align=right data-sort-value="0.63" | 630 m || 
|-id=793 bgcolor=#fefefe
| 458793 ||  || — || September 28, 2011 || Kitt Peak || Spacewatch || MAS || align=right data-sort-value="0.86" | 860 m || 
|-id=794 bgcolor=#fefefe
| 458794 ||  || — || February 4, 2009 || Mount Lemmon || Mount Lemmon Survey || — || align=right data-sort-value="0.58" | 580 m || 
|-id=795 bgcolor=#fefefe
| 458795 ||  || — || September 28, 2011 || Mount Lemmon || Mount Lemmon Survey || — || align=right data-sort-value="0.65" | 650 m || 
|-id=796 bgcolor=#fefefe
| 458796 ||  || — || September 28, 2011 || Mount Lemmon || Mount Lemmon Survey || — || align=right data-sort-value="0.50" | 500 m || 
|-id=797 bgcolor=#fefefe
| 458797 ||  || — || September 8, 2011 || Kitt Peak || Spacewatch || — || align=right data-sort-value="0.72" | 720 m || 
|-id=798 bgcolor=#fefefe
| 458798 ||  || — || September 12, 2007 || Mount Lemmon || Mount Lemmon Survey || NYScritical || align=right data-sort-value="0.60" | 600 m || 
|-id=799 bgcolor=#fefefe
| 458799 ||  || — || September 13, 2004 || Kitt Peak || Spacewatch || — || align=right data-sort-value="0.60" | 600 m || 
|-id=800 bgcolor=#fefefe
| 458800 ||  || — || October 7, 2004 || Kitt Peak || Spacewatch || — || align=right data-sort-value="0.57" | 570 m || 
|}

458801–458900 

|-bgcolor=#fefefe
| 458801 ||  || — || October 11, 2004 || Kitt Peak || Spacewatch || — || align=right data-sort-value="0.54" | 540 m || 
|-id=802 bgcolor=#fefefe
| 458802 ||  || — || March 3, 2006 || Kitt Peak || Spacewatch || — || align=right data-sort-value="0.63" | 630 m || 
|-id=803 bgcolor=#fefefe
| 458803 ||  || — || October 28, 1997 || Kitt Peak || Spacewatch || — || align=right data-sort-value="0.64" | 640 m || 
|-id=804 bgcolor=#fefefe
| 458804 ||  || — || September 20, 2011 || Kitt Peak || Spacewatch || MAS || align=right data-sort-value="0.68" | 680 m || 
|-id=805 bgcolor=#fefefe
| 458805 ||  || — || September 26, 2011 || Kitt Peak || Spacewatch || — || align=right data-sort-value="0.62" | 620 m || 
|-id=806 bgcolor=#fefefe
| 458806 ||  || — || September 8, 2011 || Kitt Peak || Spacewatch || — || align=right data-sort-value="0.67" | 670 m || 
|-id=807 bgcolor=#fefefe
| 458807 ||  || — || August 25, 2004 || Kitt Peak || Spacewatch || — || align=right data-sort-value="0.70" | 700 m || 
|-id=808 bgcolor=#fefefe
| 458808 ||  || — || July 3, 2011 || Mount Lemmon || Mount Lemmon Survey || — || align=right data-sort-value="0.69" | 690 m || 
|-id=809 bgcolor=#fefefe
| 458809 ||  || — || December 30, 2008 || Mount Lemmon || Mount Lemmon Survey || — || align=right data-sort-value="0.60" | 600 m || 
|-id=810 bgcolor=#fefefe
| 458810 ||  || — || September 13, 2007 || Catalina || CSS || — || align=right data-sort-value="0.98" | 980 m || 
|-id=811 bgcolor=#fefefe
| 458811 ||  || — || October 9, 2004 || Kitt Peak || Spacewatch || — || align=right data-sort-value="0.62" | 620 m || 
|-id=812 bgcolor=#fefefe
| 458812 ||  || — || March 13, 2010 || Mount Lemmon || Mount Lemmon Survey || — || align=right | 2.3 km || 
|-id=813 bgcolor=#fefefe
| 458813 ||  || — || December 18, 2004 || Mount Lemmon || Mount Lemmon Survey || MAS || align=right data-sort-value="0.68" | 680 m || 
|-id=814 bgcolor=#fefefe
| 458814 ||  || — || January 27, 1998 || Caussols || ODAS || — || align=right data-sort-value="0.87" | 870 m || 
|-id=815 bgcolor=#fefefe
| 458815 ||  || — || February 26, 2009 || Kitt Peak || Spacewatch || NYS || align=right data-sort-value="0.52" | 520 m || 
|-id=816 bgcolor=#fefefe
| 458816 ||  || — || August 3, 2004 || Siding Spring || SSS || — || align=right data-sort-value="0.80" | 800 m || 
|-id=817 bgcolor=#fefefe
| 458817 ||  || — || November 8, 2008 || Mount Lemmon || Mount Lemmon Survey || — || align=right data-sort-value="0.91" | 910 m || 
|-id=818 bgcolor=#fefefe
| 458818 ||  || — || September 20, 2011 || Kitt Peak || Spacewatch || — || align=right data-sort-value="0.83" | 830 m || 
|-id=819 bgcolor=#fefefe
| 458819 ||  || — || August 22, 2004 || Kitt Peak || Spacewatch || — || align=right data-sort-value="0.74" | 740 m || 
|-id=820 bgcolor=#fefefe
| 458820 ||  || — || August 28, 2011 || Siding Spring || SSS || — || align=right data-sort-value="0.98" | 980 m || 
|-id=821 bgcolor=#fefefe
| 458821 ||  || — || September 23, 2011 || Kitt Peak || Spacewatch || — || align=right data-sort-value="0.64" | 640 m || 
|-id=822 bgcolor=#fefefe
| 458822 ||  || — || October 11, 2004 || Kitt Peak || Spacewatch || — || align=right data-sort-value="0.57" | 570 m || 
|-id=823 bgcolor=#fefefe
| 458823 ||  || — || October 1, 2011 || Kitt Peak || Spacewatch || V || align=right data-sort-value="0.51" | 510 m || 
|-id=824 bgcolor=#fefefe
| 458824 ||  || — || August 24, 2007 || Kitt Peak || Spacewatch || NYS || align=right data-sort-value="0.45" | 450 m || 
|-id=825 bgcolor=#fefefe
| 458825 ||  || — || October 23, 2004 || Kitt Peak || Spacewatch || — || align=right data-sort-value="0.56" | 560 m || 
|-id=826 bgcolor=#fefefe
| 458826 ||  || — || September 3, 2007 || Catalina || CSS || — || align=right data-sort-value="0.70" | 700 m || 
|-id=827 bgcolor=#fefefe
| 458827 ||  || — || October 15, 2004 || Socorro || LINEAR || — || align=right | 1.0 km || 
|-id=828 bgcolor=#fefefe
| 458828 ||  || — || October 7, 2004 || Anderson Mesa || LONEOS || — || align=right data-sort-value="0.93" | 930 m || 
|-id=829 bgcolor=#fefefe
| 458829 ||  || — || January 2, 2009 || Mount Lemmon || Mount Lemmon Survey || — || align=right | 1.2 km || 
|-id=830 bgcolor=#fefefe
| 458830 ||  || — || August 24, 2000 || Socorro || LINEAR || — || align=right data-sort-value="0.86" | 860 m || 
|-id=831 bgcolor=#fefefe
| 458831 ||  || — || October 17, 2011 || Kitt Peak || Spacewatch || (2076) || align=right data-sort-value="0.68" | 680 m || 
|-id=832 bgcolor=#fefefe
| 458832 ||  || — || December 30, 2008 || Kitt Peak || Spacewatch || — || align=right data-sort-value="0.81" | 810 m || 
|-id=833 bgcolor=#fefefe
| 458833 ||  || — || October 17, 2011 || Kitt Peak || Spacewatch || — || align=right data-sort-value="0.77" | 770 m || 
|-id=834 bgcolor=#fefefe
| 458834 ||  || — || September 4, 2007 || Mount Lemmon || Mount Lemmon Survey || — || align=right data-sort-value="0.62" | 620 m || 
|-id=835 bgcolor=#fefefe
| 458835 ||  || — || October 6, 2000 || Anderson Mesa || LONEOS || — || align=right data-sort-value="0.83" | 830 m || 
|-id=836 bgcolor=#fefefe
| 458836 ||  || — || September 23, 2011 || Mount Lemmon || Mount Lemmon Survey || — || align=right data-sort-value="0.74" | 740 m || 
|-id=837 bgcolor=#fefefe
| 458837 ||  || — || September 21, 2011 || Kitt Peak || Spacewatch || — || align=right data-sort-value="0.60" | 600 m || 
|-id=838 bgcolor=#fefefe
| 458838 ||  || — || September 30, 2011 || Kitt Peak || Spacewatch || — || align=right data-sort-value="0.57" | 570 m || 
|-id=839 bgcolor=#fefefe
| 458839 ||  || — || September 26, 2011 || Kitt Peak || Spacewatch || — || align=right data-sort-value="0.59" | 590 m || 
|-id=840 bgcolor=#fefefe
| 458840 ||  || — || September 20, 2011 || Kitt Peak || Spacewatch || — || align=right data-sort-value="0.81" | 810 m || 
|-id=841 bgcolor=#fefefe
| 458841 ||  || — || December 19, 2004 || Mount Lemmon || Mount Lemmon Survey || NYS || align=right data-sort-value="0.72" | 720 m || 
|-id=842 bgcolor=#fefefe
| 458842 ||  || — || October 18, 2011 || Kitt Peak || Spacewatch || — || align=right | 1.1 km || 
|-id=843 bgcolor=#fefefe
| 458843 ||  || — || September 23, 2011 || Mount Lemmon || Mount Lemmon Survey || — || align=right data-sort-value="0.63" | 630 m || 
|-id=844 bgcolor=#fefefe
| 458844 ||  || — || June 29, 1997 || Kitt Peak || Spacewatch || — || align=right data-sort-value="0.76" | 760 m || 
|-id=845 bgcolor=#fefefe
| 458845 ||  || — || November 19, 2004 || Kitt Peak || Spacewatch || — || align=right data-sort-value="0.78" | 780 m || 
|-id=846 bgcolor=#fefefe
| 458846 ||  || — || September 20, 2011 || Kitt Peak || Spacewatch || CLA || align=right | 1.9 km || 
|-id=847 bgcolor=#fefefe
| 458847 ||  || — || February 3, 2009 || Kitt Peak || Spacewatch || NYS || align=right data-sort-value="0.69" | 690 m || 
|-id=848 bgcolor=#fefefe
| 458848 ||  || — || October 22, 2011 || Mount Lemmon || Mount Lemmon Survey || — || align=right data-sort-value="0.89" | 890 m || 
|-id=849 bgcolor=#fefefe
| 458849 ||  || — || October 19, 2011 || Kitt Peak || Spacewatch || — || align=right data-sort-value="0.70" | 700 m || 
|-id=850 bgcolor=#fefefe
| 458850 ||  || — || September 30, 2011 || Kitt Peak || Spacewatch || — || align=right data-sort-value="0.74" | 740 m || 
|-id=851 bgcolor=#d6d6d6
| 458851 ||  || — || September 13, 2005 || Kitt Peak || Spacewatch || EOS || align=right | 1.8 km || 
|-id=852 bgcolor=#fefefe
| 458852 ||  || — || September 11, 2007 || Mount Lemmon || Mount Lemmon Survey || MAS || align=right data-sort-value="0.52" | 520 m || 
|-id=853 bgcolor=#fefefe
| 458853 ||  || — || September 23, 2011 || Mount Lemmon || Mount Lemmon Survey || — || align=right data-sort-value="0.62" | 620 m || 
|-id=854 bgcolor=#fefefe
| 458854 ||  || — || November 4, 2004 || Kitt Peak || Spacewatch || — || align=right data-sort-value="0.63" | 630 m || 
|-id=855 bgcolor=#fefefe
| 458855 ||  || — || October 19, 2011 || Kitt Peak || Spacewatch || — || align=right data-sort-value="0.70" | 700 m || 
|-id=856 bgcolor=#fefefe
| 458856 ||  || — || October 19, 2011 || Kitt Peak || Spacewatch || — || align=right data-sort-value="0.69" | 690 m || 
|-id=857 bgcolor=#fefefe
| 458857 ||  || — || October 21, 2011 || Mount Lemmon || Mount Lemmon Survey || — || align=right data-sort-value="0.85" | 850 m || 
|-id=858 bgcolor=#fefefe
| 458858 ||  || — || October 19, 2011 || Mount Lemmon || Mount Lemmon Survey || — || align=right data-sort-value="0.65" | 650 m || 
|-id=859 bgcolor=#fefefe
| 458859 ||  || — || January 20, 2009 || Kitt Peak || Spacewatch || — || align=right data-sort-value="0.66" | 660 m || 
|-id=860 bgcolor=#fefefe
| 458860 ||  || — || October 7, 2004 || Kitt Peak || Spacewatch || — || align=right data-sort-value="0.64" | 640 m || 
|-id=861 bgcolor=#fefefe
| 458861 ||  || — || September 21, 2011 || Kitt Peak || Spacewatch || — || align=right data-sort-value="0.55" | 550 m || 
|-id=862 bgcolor=#fefefe
| 458862 ||  || — || October 20, 2011 || Kitt Peak || Spacewatch || — || align=right data-sort-value="0.89" | 890 m || 
|-id=863 bgcolor=#fefefe
| 458863 ||  || — || September 10, 2004 || Kitt Peak || Spacewatch || — || align=right data-sort-value="0.62" | 620 m || 
|-id=864 bgcolor=#fefefe
| 458864 ||  || — || October 1, 2011 || Kitt Peak || Spacewatch || — || align=right data-sort-value="0.78" | 780 m || 
|-id=865 bgcolor=#fefefe
| 458865 ||  || — || January 16, 2009 || Kitt Peak || Spacewatch || — || align=right data-sort-value="0.59" | 590 m || 
|-id=866 bgcolor=#fefefe
| 458866 ||  || — || October 7, 2004 || Kitt Peak || Spacewatch || — || align=right data-sort-value="0.51" | 510 m || 
|-id=867 bgcolor=#fefefe
| 458867 ||  || — || October 20, 2011 || Kitt Peak || Spacewatch || — || align=right | 1.00 km || 
|-id=868 bgcolor=#fefefe
| 458868 ||  || — || October 10, 2007 || Catalina || CSS || — || align=right data-sort-value="0.98" | 980 m || 
|-id=869 bgcolor=#fefefe
| 458869 ||  || — || January 18, 2009 || Mount Lemmon || Mount Lemmon Survey || — || align=right data-sort-value="0.60" | 600 m || 
|-id=870 bgcolor=#fefefe
| 458870 ||  || — || December 13, 2004 || Kitt Peak || Spacewatch || — || align=right data-sort-value="0.88" | 880 m || 
|-id=871 bgcolor=#fefefe
| 458871 ||  || — || January 20, 2009 || Kitt Peak || Spacewatch || — || align=right data-sort-value="0.56" | 560 m || 
|-id=872 bgcolor=#fefefe
| 458872 ||  || — || December 21, 2008 || Kitt Peak || Spacewatch || — || align=right data-sort-value="0.94" | 940 m || 
|-id=873 bgcolor=#fefefe
| 458873 ||  || — || October 15, 2004 || Mount Lemmon || Mount Lemmon Survey || NYS || align=right data-sort-value="0.60" | 600 m || 
|-id=874 bgcolor=#fefefe
| 458874 ||  || — || September 24, 2011 || Mount Lemmon || Mount Lemmon Survey || V || align=right data-sort-value="0.70" | 700 m || 
|-id=875 bgcolor=#fefefe
| 458875 ||  || — || October 22, 2011 || Kitt Peak || Spacewatch || — || align=right data-sort-value="0.54" | 540 m || 
|-id=876 bgcolor=#fefefe
| 458876 ||  || — || November 17, 2000 || Kitt Peak || Spacewatch || — || align=right data-sort-value="0.61" | 610 m || 
|-id=877 bgcolor=#fefefe
| 458877 ||  || — || September 22, 2011 || Mount Lemmon || Mount Lemmon Survey || NYS || align=right data-sort-value="0.69" | 690 m || 
|-id=878 bgcolor=#fefefe
| 458878 ||  || — || September 24, 2011 || Mount Lemmon || Mount Lemmon Survey || — || align=right data-sort-value="0.72" | 720 m || 
|-id=879 bgcolor=#fefefe
| 458879 ||  || — || October 22, 2011 || Kitt Peak || Spacewatch || (2076) || align=right data-sort-value="0.71" | 710 m || 
|-id=880 bgcolor=#fefefe
| 458880 ||  || — || September 11, 2007 || Kitt Peak || Spacewatch || MAS || align=right data-sort-value="0.78" | 780 m || 
|-id=881 bgcolor=#fefefe
| 458881 ||  || — || October 19, 2011 || Kitt Peak || Spacewatch || — || align=right data-sort-value="0.69" | 690 m || 
|-id=882 bgcolor=#fefefe
| 458882 ||  || — || October 23, 2011 || Kitt Peak || Spacewatch || — || align=right data-sort-value="0.75" | 750 m || 
|-id=883 bgcolor=#fefefe
| 458883 ||  || — || October 18, 2011 || Catalina || CSS || V || align=right data-sort-value="0.89" | 890 m || 
|-id=884 bgcolor=#fefefe
| 458884 ||  || — || October 19, 2011 || Catalina || CSS || — || align=right data-sort-value="0.81" | 810 m || 
|-id=885 bgcolor=#fefefe
| 458885 ||  || — || January 17, 2009 || Kitt Peak || Spacewatch || — || align=right data-sort-value="0.88" | 880 m || 
|-id=886 bgcolor=#fefefe
| 458886 ||  || — || October 23, 2011 || Kitt Peak || Spacewatch || — || align=right data-sort-value="0.91" | 910 m || 
|-id=887 bgcolor=#fefefe
| 458887 ||  || — || March 13, 2005 || Mount Lemmon || Mount Lemmon Survey || — || align=right data-sort-value="0.66" | 660 m || 
|-id=888 bgcolor=#fefefe
| 458888 ||  || — || January 18, 2009 || Kitt Peak || Spacewatch || V || align=right data-sort-value="0.75" | 750 m || 
|-id=889 bgcolor=#fefefe
| 458889 ||  || — || October 20, 2011 || Kitt Peak || Spacewatch || — || align=right data-sort-value="0.63" | 630 m || 
|-id=890 bgcolor=#fefefe
| 458890 ||  || — || October 24, 2011 || Kitt Peak || Spacewatch || NYS || align=right data-sort-value="0.59" | 590 m || 
|-id=891 bgcolor=#fefefe
| 458891 ||  || — || October 24, 2011 || Kitt Peak || Spacewatch || — || align=right data-sort-value="0.86" | 860 m || 
|-id=892 bgcolor=#E9E9E9
| 458892 ||  || — || November 19, 2007 || Kitt Peak || Spacewatch || — || align=right | 1.1 km || 
|-id=893 bgcolor=#fefefe
| 458893 ||  || — || February 1, 2009 || Kitt Peak || Spacewatch || — || align=right data-sort-value="0.88" | 880 m || 
|-id=894 bgcolor=#fefefe
| 458894 ||  || — || December 3, 2008 || Mount Lemmon || Mount Lemmon Survey || — || align=right data-sort-value="0.97" | 970 m || 
|-id=895 bgcolor=#fefefe
| 458895 ||  || — || December 31, 2008 || Mount Lemmon || Mount Lemmon Survey || — || align=right data-sort-value="0.62" | 620 m || 
|-id=896 bgcolor=#fefefe
| 458896 ||  || — || October 25, 2011 || Kitt Peak || Spacewatch || — || align=right data-sort-value="0.73" | 730 m || 
|-id=897 bgcolor=#fefefe
| 458897 ||  || — || March 31, 2009 || Kitt Peak || Spacewatch || NYS || align=right data-sort-value="0.52" | 520 m || 
|-id=898 bgcolor=#fefefe
| 458898 ||  || — || September 27, 2000 || Socorro || LINEAR || — || align=right data-sort-value="0.71" | 710 m || 
|-id=899 bgcolor=#fefefe
| 458899 ||  || — || September 10, 2007 || Mount Lemmon || Mount Lemmon Survey || — || align=right data-sort-value="0.65" | 650 m || 
|-id=900 bgcolor=#fefefe
| 458900 ||  || — || September 11, 2007 || Kitt Peak || Spacewatch || NYS || align=right data-sort-value="0.58" | 580 m || 
|}

458901–459000 

|-bgcolor=#fefefe
| 458901 ||  || — || September 13, 2007 || Mount Lemmon || Mount Lemmon Survey || — || align=right data-sort-value="0.58" | 580 m || 
|-id=902 bgcolor=#fefefe
| 458902 ||  || — || September 24, 2011 || Mount Lemmon || Mount Lemmon Survey || — || align=right data-sort-value="0.65" | 650 m || 
|-id=903 bgcolor=#fefefe
| 458903 ||  || — || December 20, 2004 || Mount Lemmon || Mount Lemmon Survey || — || align=right data-sort-value="0.63" | 630 m || 
|-id=904 bgcolor=#fefefe
| 458904 ||  || — || September 26, 2011 || Kitt Peak || Spacewatch || — || align=right data-sort-value="0.73" | 730 m || 
|-id=905 bgcolor=#fefefe
| 458905 ||  || — || September 20, 2011 || Kitt Peak || Spacewatch || MAScritical || align=right data-sort-value="0.71" | 710 m || 
|-id=906 bgcolor=#fefefe
| 458906 ||  || — || May 21, 2006 || Kitt Peak || Spacewatch || — || align=right data-sort-value="0.91" | 910 m || 
|-id=907 bgcolor=#fefefe
| 458907 ||  || — || November 29, 1997 || Kitt Peak || Spacewatch || — || align=right data-sort-value="0.64" | 640 m || 
|-id=908 bgcolor=#fefefe
| 458908 ||  || — || October 7, 2004 || Kitt Peak || Spacewatch || — || align=right data-sort-value="0.55" | 550 m || 
|-id=909 bgcolor=#fefefe
| 458909 ||  || — || November 24, 2000 || Kitt Peak || Spacewatch || — || align=right data-sort-value="0.57" | 570 m || 
|-id=910 bgcolor=#fefefe
| 458910 ||  || — || April 10, 2010 || Mount Lemmon || Mount Lemmon Survey || — || align=right data-sort-value="0.81" | 810 m || 
|-id=911 bgcolor=#fefefe
| 458911 ||  || — || October 18, 2011 || Kitt Peak || Spacewatch || — || align=right data-sort-value="0.64" | 640 m || 
|-id=912 bgcolor=#fefefe
| 458912 ||  || — || September 14, 2007 || Mount Lemmon || Mount Lemmon Survey || — || align=right data-sort-value="0.62" | 620 m || 
|-id=913 bgcolor=#fefefe
| 458913 ||  || — || September 12, 2007 || Kitt Peak || Spacewatch || — || align=right data-sort-value="0.65" | 650 m || 
|-id=914 bgcolor=#fefefe
| 458914 ||  || — || October 5, 2003 || Kitt Peak || Spacewatch || critical || align=right data-sort-value="0.57" | 570 m || 
|-id=915 bgcolor=#fefefe
| 458915 ||  || — || September 5, 2007 || Catalina || CSS || — || align=right data-sort-value="0.85" | 850 m || 
|-id=916 bgcolor=#fefefe
| 458916 ||  || — || October 1, 2000 || Anderson Mesa || LONEOS || — || align=right data-sort-value="0.78" | 780 m || 
|-id=917 bgcolor=#fefefe
| 458917 ||  || — || May 6, 2010 || Mount Lemmon || Mount Lemmon Survey || — || align=right data-sort-value="0.57" | 570 m || 
|-id=918 bgcolor=#fefefe
| 458918 ||  || — || October 1, 2011 || Mount Lemmon || Mount Lemmon Survey || (2076) || align=right data-sort-value="0.66" | 660 m || 
|-id=919 bgcolor=#fefefe
| 458919 ||  || — || September 10, 2007 || Mount Lemmon || Mount Lemmon Survey || NYS || align=right data-sort-value="0.46" | 460 m || 
|-id=920 bgcolor=#fefefe
| 458920 ||  || — || November 4, 2004 || Kitt Peak || Spacewatch || — || align=right data-sort-value="0.94" | 940 m || 
|-id=921 bgcolor=#fefefe
| 458921 ||  || — || October 24, 2011 || Kitt Peak || Spacewatch || V || align=right data-sort-value="0.60" | 600 m || 
|-id=922 bgcolor=#fefefe
| 458922 ||  || — || November 20, 2004 || Kitt Peak || Spacewatch || — || align=right data-sort-value="0.68" | 680 m || 
|-id=923 bgcolor=#fefefe
| 458923 ||  || — || September 21, 2011 || Catalina || CSS || — || align=right data-sort-value="0.70" | 700 m || 
|-id=924 bgcolor=#fefefe
| 458924 ||  || — || September 13, 2007 || Mount Lemmon || Mount Lemmon Survey || — || align=right data-sort-value="0.65" | 650 m || 
|-id=925 bgcolor=#fefefe
| 458925 ||  || — || October 28, 2011 || Kitt Peak || Spacewatch || — || align=right data-sort-value="0.82" | 820 m || 
|-id=926 bgcolor=#fefefe
| 458926 ||  || — || October 11, 1996 || Kitt Peak || Spacewatch || — || align=right data-sort-value="0.87" | 870 m || 
|-id=927 bgcolor=#E9E9E9
| 458927 ||  || — || April 24, 2009 || Mount Lemmon || Mount Lemmon Survey || — || align=right data-sort-value="0.91" | 910 m || 
|-id=928 bgcolor=#fefefe
| 458928 ||  || — || October 1, 2011 || Mount Lemmon || Mount Lemmon Survey || — || align=right data-sort-value="0.59" | 590 m || 
|-id=929 bgcolor=#fefefe
| 458929 ||  || — || October 1, 2011 || Kitt Peak || Spacewatch || V || align=right data-sort-value="0.53" | 530 m || 
|-id=930 bgcolor=#fefefe
| 458930 ||  || — || October 15, 2004 || Mount Lemmon || Mount Lemmon Survey || — || align=right data-sort-value="0.71" | 710 m || 
|-id=931 bgcolor=#fefefe
| 458931 ||  || — || October 19, 2011 || Mount Lemmon || Mount Lemmon Survey || — || align=right data-sort-value="0.70" | 700 m || 
|-id=932 bgcolor=#fefefe
| 458932 ||  || — || October 18, 2011 || Kitt Peak || Spacewatch || critical || align=right data-sort-value="0.75" | 750 m || 
|-id=933 bgcolor=#fefefe
| 458933 ||  || — || October 30, 2011 || Kitt Peak || Spacewatch || — || align=right data-sort-value="0.66" | 660 m || 
|-id=934 bgcolor=#fefefe
| 458934 ||  || — || December 16, 2004 || Kitt Peak || Spacewatch || MAS || align=right data-sort-value="0.61" | 610 m || 
|-id=935 bgcolor=#fefefe
| 458935 ||  || — || December 9, 2004 || Kitt Peak || Spacewatch || — || align=right data-sort-value="0.67" | 670 m || 
|-id=936 bgcolor=#fefefe
| 458936 ||  || — || January 29, 2009 || Mount Lemmon || Mount Lemmon Survey || — || align=right data-sort-value="0.68" | 680 m || 
|-id=937 bgcolor=#fefefe
| 458937 ||  || — || October 23, 2004 || Kitt Peak || Spacewatch || — || align=right data-sort-value="0.68" | 680 m || 
|-id=938 bgcolor=#fefefe
| 458938 ||  || — || November 11, 2004 || Kitt Peak || Spacewatch || — || align=right data-sort-value="0.59" | 590 m || 
|-id=939 bgcolor=#fefefe
| 458939 ||  || — || October 1, 2008 || Kitt Peak || Spacewatch || — || align=right data-sort-value="0.98" | 980 m || 
|-id=940 bgcolor=#fefefe
| 458940 ||  || — || September 21, 2011 || Mount Lemmon || Mount Lemmon Survey || — || align=right data-sort-value="0.79" | 790 m || 
|-id=941 bgcolor=#fefefe
| 458941 ||  || — || November 19, 2001 || Anderson Mesa || LONEOS || — || align=right data-sort-value="0.70" | 700 m || 
|-id=942 bgcolor=#fefefe
| 458942 ||  || — || December 30, 2008 || Kitt Peak || Spacewatch || — || align=right data-sort-value="0.99" | 990 m || 
|-id=943 bgcolor=#fefefe
| 458943 ||  || — || December 29, 2008 || Mount Lemmon || Mount Lemmon Survey || — || align=right data-sort-value="0.62" | 620 m || 
|-id=944 bgcolor=#E9E9E9
| 458944 ||  || — || October 24, 2007 || Mount Lemmon || Mount Lemmon Survey || — || align=right | 1.1 km || 
|-id=945 bgcolor=#fefefe
| 458945 ||  || — || October 19, 2000 || Kitt Peak || Spacewatch || — || align=right data-sort-value="0.75" | 750 m || 
|-id=946 bgcolor=#fefefe
| 458946 ||  || — || September 8, 2000 || Kitt Peak || Spacewatch || — || align=right data-sort-value="0.62" | 620 m || 
|-id=947 bgcolor=#fefefe
| 458947 ||  || — || March 2, 2006 || Kitt Peak || Spacewatch || — || align=right data-sort-value="0.82" | 820 m || 
|-id=948 bgcolor=#E9E9E9
| 458948 ||  || — || October 20, 2011 || Kitt Peak || Spacewatch || — || align=right data-sort-value="0.88" | 880 m || 
|-id=949 bgcolor=#fefefe
| 458949 ||  || — || September 27, 2011 || Mount Lemmon || Mount Lemmon Survey || — || align=right data-sort-value="0.64" | 640 m || 
|-id=950 bgcolor=#fefefe
| 458950 ||  || — || November 5, 2004 || Kitt Peak || Spacewatch || — || align=right data-sort-value="0.60" | 600 m || 
|-id=951 bgcolor=#fefefe
| 458951 ||  || — || October 15, 2007 || Mount Lemmon || Mount Lemmon Survey || NYS || align=right data-sort-value="0.55" | 550 m || 
|-id=952 bgcolor=#E9E9E9
| 458952 ||  || — || September 30, 2011 || Mount Lemmon || Mount Lemmon Survey || EUN || align=right | 1.1 km || 
|-id=953 bgcolor=#fefefe
| 458953 ||  || — || April 11, 2010 || Mount Lemmon || Mount Lemmon Survey || — || align=right data-sort-value="0.76" | 760 m || 
|-id=954 bgcolor=#fefefe
| 458954 ||  || — || December 29, 2008 || Mount Lemmon || Mount Lemmon Survey || — || align=right data-sort-value="0.61" | 610 m || 
|-id=955 bgcolor=#fefefe
| 458955 ||  || — || September 28, 2011 || Mount Lemmon || Mount Lemmon Survey || NYS || align=right data-sort-value="0.62" | 620 m || 
|-id=956 bgcolor=#fefefe
| 458956 ||  || — || September 10, 2007 || Mount Lemmon || Mount Lemmon Survey || — || align=right | 1.1 km || 
|-id=957 bgcolor=#fefefe
| 458957 ||  || — || October 31, 2011 || Kitt Peak || Spacewatch || — || align=right data-sort-value="0.82" | 820 m || 
|-id=958 bgcolor=#fefefe
| 458958 ||  || — || January 23, 2006 || Mount Lemmon || Mount Lemmon Survey || — || align=right data-sort-value="0.88" | 880 m || 
|-id=959 bgcolor=#fefefe
| 458959 ||  || — || December 11, 2004 || Kitt Peak || Spacewatch || MAS || align=right data-sort-value="0.62" | 620 m || 
|-id=960 bgcolor=#fefefe
| 458960 ||  || — || November 1, 2011 || Catalina || CSS || V || align=right data-sort-value="0.78" | 780 m || 
|-id=961 bgcolor=#fefefe
| 458961 ||  || — || October 18, 2011 || Kitt Peak || Spacewatch || — || align=right data-sort-value="0.75" | 750 m || 
|-id=962 bgcolor=#fefefe
| 458962 ||  || — || May 7, 2010 || Mount Lemmon || Mount Lemmon Survey || — || align=right data-sort-value="0.70" | 700 m || 
|-id=963 bgcolor=#E9E9E9
| 458963 ||  || — || November 18, 2007 || Mount Lemmon || Mount Lemmon Survey || — || align=right data-sort-value="0.75" | 750 m || 
|-id=964 bgcolor=#FFC2E0
| 458964 ||  || — || November 17, 2011 || Catalina || CSS || AMO || align=right data-sort-value="0.32" | 320 m || 
|-id=965 bgcolor=#fefefe
| 458965 ||  || — || January 28, 2006 || Kitt Peak || Spacewatch || — || align=right data-sort-value="0.77" | 770 m || 
|-id=966 bgcolor=#fefefe
| 458966 ||  || — || October 7, 2007 || Mount Lemmon || Mount Lemmon Survey || MAS || align=right data-sort-value="0.66" | 660 m || 
|-id=967 bgcolor=#fefefe
| 458967 ||  || — || October 23, 2011 || Kitt Peak || Spacewatch || — || align=right data-sort-value="0.65" | 650 m || 
|-id=968 bgcolor=#fefefe
| 458968 ||  || — || May 7, 2010 || Mount Lemmon || Mount Lemmon Survey || — || align=right data-sort-value="0.86" | 860 m || 
|-id=969 bgcolor=#fefefe
| 458969 ||  || — || October 6, 2004 || Kitt Peak || Spacewatch || — || align=right data-sort-value="0.62" | 620 m || 
|-id=970 bgcolor=#fefefe
| 458970 ||  || — || April 11, 2010 || Mount Lemmon || Mount Lemmon Survey || — || align=right data-sort-value="0.78" | 780 m || 
|-id=971 bgcolor=#fefefe
| 458971 ||  || — || October 16, 2007 || Mount Lemmon || Mount Lemmon Survey || — || align=right data-sort-value="0.67" | 670 m || 
|-id=972 bgcolor=#fefefe
| 458972 ||  || — || October 21, 2007 || Mount Lemmon || Mount Lemmon Survey || — || align=right | 1.2 km || 
|-id=973 bgcolor=#fefefe
| 458973 ||  || — || October 19, 2000 || Kitt Peak || Spacewatch || — || align=right data-sort-value="0.73" | 730 m || 
|-id=974 bgcolor=#fefefe
| 458974 ||  || — || April 19, 2009 || Mount Lemmon || Mount Lemmon Survey || — || align=right data-sort-value="0.65" | 650 m || 
|-id=975 bgcolor=#fefefe
| 458975 ||  || — || January 15, 2005 || Kitt Peak || Spacewatch || MAS || align=right data-sort-value="0.49" | 490 m || 
|-id=976 bgcolor=#fefefe
| 458976 ||  || — || October 9, 2004 || Kitt Peak || Spacewatch || — || align=right data-sort-value="0.56" | 560 m || 
|-id=977 bgcolor=#fefefe
| 458977 ||  || — || February 4, 2005 || Kitt Peak || Spacewatch || NYS || align=right data-sort-value="0.49" | 490 m || 
|-id=978 bgcolor=#fefefe
| 458978 ||  || — || August 8, 2007 || Siding Spring || SSS || — || align=right | 2.8 km || 
|-id=979 bgcolor=#E9E9E9
| 458979 ||  || — || November 26, 2011 || Mount Lemmon || Mount Lemmon Survey || — || align=right | 1.3 km || 
|-id=980 bgcolor=#fefefe
| 458980 ||  || — || November 9, 2004 || Catalina || CSS || — || align=right data-sort-value="0.65" | 650 m || 
|-id=981 bgcolor=#fefefe
| 458981 ||  || — || December 9, 2004 || Kitt Peak || Spacewatch || NYS || align=right data-sort-value="0.60" | 600 m || 
|-id=982 bgcolor=#fefefe
| 458982 ||  || — || September 30, 2007 || Kitt Peak || Spacewatch || NYS || align=right data-sort-value="0.59" | 590 m || 
|-id=983 bgcolor=#fefefe
| 458983 ||  || — || October 27, 2011 || Mount Lemmon || Mount Lemmon Survey || V || align=right data-sort-value="0.62" | 620 m || 
|-id=984 bgcolor=#fefefe
| 458984 ||  || — || November 3, 2011 || Kitt Peak || Spacewatch || — || align=right data-sort-value="0.91" | 910 m || 
|-id=985 bgcolor=#fefefe
| 458985 ||  || — || November 1, 2011 || Mount Lemmon || Mount Lemmon Survey || — || align=right | 1.1 km || 
|-id=986 bgcolor=#fefefe
| 458986 ||  || — || October 27, 2011 || Mount Lemmon || Mount Lemmon Survey || — || align=right data-sort-value="0.70" | 700 m || 
|-id=987 bgcolor=#fefefe
| 458987 ||  || — || October 21, 2011 || Mount Lemmon || Mount Lemmon Survey || — || align=right data-sort-value="0.57" | 570 m || 
|-id=988 bgcolor=#fefefe
| 458988 ||  || — || November 3, 2011 || Kitt Peak || Spacewatch || — || align=right data-sort-value="0.63" | 630 m || 
|-id=989 bgcolor=#E9E9E9
| 458989 ||  || — || February 12, 2004 || Kitt Peak || Spacewatch || — || align=right | 1.4 km || 
|-id=990 bgcolor=#fefefe
| 458990 ||  || — || September 14, 2007 || Mount Lemmon || Mount Lemmon Survey || — || align=right data-sort-value="0.84" | 840 m || 
|-id=991 bgcolor=#fefefe
| 458991 ||  || — || January 6, 2005 || Catalina || CSS || — || align=right | 1.0 km || 
|-id=992 bgcolor=#fefefe
| 458992 ||  || — || January 16, 2005 || Kitt Peak || Spacewatch || — || align=right data-sort-value="0.85" | 850 m || 
|-id=993 bgcolor=#E9E9E9
| 458993 ||  || — || November 19, 2003 || Kitt Peak || Spacewatch || — || align=right data-sort-value="0.71" | 710 m || 
|-id=994 bgcolor=#fefefe
| 458994 ||  || — || November 11, 2004 || Kitt Peak || Spacewatch || — || align=right data-sort-value="0.49" | 490 m || 
|-id=995 bgcolor=#fefefe
| 458995 ||  || — || March 3, 2009 || Mount Lemmon || Mount Lemmon Survey || NYS || align=right data-sort-value="0.44" | 440 m || 
|-id=996 bgcolor=#fefefe
| 458996 ||  || — || September 11, 2007 || Kitt Peak || Spacewatch || MAS || align=right data-sort-value="0.54" | 540 m || 
|-id=997 bgcolor=#fefefe
| 458997 ||  || — || November 17, 2011 || Kitt Peak || Spacewatch || — || align=right data-sort-value="0.76" | 760 m || 
|-id=998 bgcolor=#fefefe
| 458998 ||  || — || September 12, 2007 || Mount Lemmon || Mount Lemmon Survey || MAS || align=right data-sort-value="0.49" | 490 m || 
|-id=999 bgcolor=#fefefe
| 458999 ||  || — || October 8, 2007 || Mount Lemmon || Mount Lemmon Survey || — || align=right data-sort-value="0.71" | 710 m || 
|-id=000 bgcolor=#d6d6d6
| 459000 ||  || — || May 13, 2009 || Kitt Peak || Spacewatch || — || align=right | 3.9 km || 
|}

References

External links 
 Discovery Circumstances: Numbered Minor Planets (455001)–(460000) (IAU Minor Planet Center)

0458